There have been many cases of sexual abuse of children by Catholic priests, nuns, and other members of religious life. In the 20th and 21st centuries, the cases have involved many allegations, investigations, trials, convictions, acknowledgement and apologies by Church authorities, and revelations about decades of instances of abuse and attempts by Church officials to cover them up. The abused include mostly boys but also girls, some as young as three years old, with the majority between the ages of 11 and 14. Criminal cases for the most part do not cover sexual harassment of adults. The accusations of abuse and cover-ups began to receive public attention during the late 1980s. Many of these cases allege decades of abuse, frequently made by adults or older youths years after the abuse occurred. Cases have also been brought against members of the Catholic hierarchy who covered up sex abuse allegations and moved abusive priests to other parishes, where abuse continued.

By the 1990s, the cases began to receive significant media and public attention in countries including in Canada, United States, Chile, Australia and Ireland, and much of Europe and South America. In 2002, an investigation by The Boston Globe led to widespread media coverage of the issue in the United States. Widespread abuse has been exposed in Europe, Australia, Chile, and the United States, reflecting worldwide patterns of long-term abuse as well as the Church hierarchy's pattern of regularly covering up reports of abuse.

From 2001 to 2010, the Holy See examined sex abuse cases involving about 3,000 priests, some of which dated back fifty years. Diocesan officials and academics knowledgeable about the Catholic Church say that sexual abuse by clergy is generally not discussed, and thus is difficult to measure. Members of the Church's hierarchy have argued that media coverage was excessive and disproportionate, and that such abuse also takes place in other religions and institutions, a stance that dismayed critics who saw it as a device to avoid resolving the abuse problem within the Church.

In a 2001 apology, John Paul II called sexual abuse within the Church "a profound contradiction of the teaching and witness of Jesus Christ". Benedict XVI apologised, met with victims, and spoke of his "shame" at the evil of abuse, calling for perpetrators to be brought to justice, and denouncing mishandling by church authorities. In January 2018, referring to a particular case in Chile, Pope Francis accused victims of fabricating allegations; by April, he was apologizing for his "tragic error", and by August was expressing "shame and sorrow" for the tragic history. He convened a four-day summit meeting with the participation of the presidents of all the episcopal conferences of the world, which was held in Vatican City from 21 to 24 February 2019, to discuss preventing sexual abuse by Catholic Church clergy. In December 2019, Pope Francis made sweeping changes that allow for greater transparency. In June 2021, a team of U.N. special rapporteurs for the Office of the High Commissioner for Human Rights (OHCHR) criticized the Vatican, pointing to persistent allegations that the Catholic Church had obstructed and failed to cooperate with domestic judicial proceedings in order to prevent accountability for abusers and compensation for victims.

Some Christian media and institutions have criticized the reporting media for anti-Catholic bias. A report issued by Christian Ministry Resources (CMR) in 2002 stated that contrary to popular opinion, there are more allegations of child sexual abuse in Protestant congregations than Catholic ones, and that sexual violence is most often committed by volunteers rather than by priests themselves. The report also criticized the way the media reported sexual crimes, stating that the Australian media reported on sexual abuse allegations against Catholic clergy but ignored such allegations against Protestant churches and Jehovah's Witnesses. Stephen Joseph Rossetti, a Catholic priest, reported that the frequency of pedophilia amongst the Catholic clergy is no higher than among general population, and a Catholic priest is no more likely to be a pedophile than an average male.

International extent of abuse 

Sexual abuse in the Catholic Church has been reported as far back as the 11th century, when Peter Damian wrote the treatise Liber Gomorrhianus against such abuses and others. In the late 15th century, Katharina von Zimmern and her sister were removed from their abbey to live in their family's house for a while partly because the young girls were molested by priests. In 1531, Martin Luther claimed that Pope Leo X had vetoed a measure that cardinals should restrict the number of boys they kept for their pleasure, "otherwise it would have been spread throughout the world how openly and shamelessly the Pope and the cardinals in Rome practice sodomy."

The sexual abuse of children below the age of consent by priests has received significant media and public attention in the United States, Canada, Ireland, the United Kingdom, the Philippines, Belgium, France, Germany, and Australia. Cases have also been reported in other nations throughout the world. Many of the cases span several decades and are brought forward years after the abuse occurred.

Although nationwide inquiries have been conducted only in the United States and Ireland, as well as an Australian inquiry into institutional responses, cases of clerical sexual abuse of minors have been reported and prosecuted in New Zealand, Canada and other countries.  In 1995, Austrian Cardinal Hans Hermann Groër resigned from his post as Archbishop of Vienna over allegations of sexual abuse, although he remained a Cardinal. Since 1995, more than 100 priests from various parts of Australia were convicted of sexual abuse.

In Ireland, the Commission to Inquire into Child Abuse issued a report that covered six decades (from the 1950s). It noted "endemic" sexual abuse in Catholic boys' institutions, saying that church leaders were aware of abuses and that government inspectors failed to "stop beatings, rapes and humiliation." The report noted the "centrality of poverty and social vulnerability in the lives of the victims of abuse."

In Australia, according to Broken Rites, a support and advocacy group for church-related sex abuse victims,  there have been over one hundred cases in which Catholic priests have been charged for child sex offenses. A 2012 police report claimed that 40 suicide deaths were directly related to abuse by Catholic clergy in the state of Victoria. In January 2013, an Australian Royal Commission into Institutional Responses to Child Sexual Abuse was called to investigate institutional sexual abuse of minors related, but not exclusive, to matters concerning clergy of the Catholic Church.

Of the Catholic sexual abuse cases in Latin America, the most widely known is the sexual scandal of Father Marcial Maciel, the founder of the Legion of Christ, a Roman Catholic congregation. The revelations took place after the Legion spent more than a decade denying allegations and criticizing the victims who claimed abuse.

In Tanzania, Father Kit Cunningham and three other priests were exposed as pedophiles after Cunningham's death. The abuse took place in the 1960s but was only publicly revealed in 2011, largely through a BBC documentary.

Church officials and academics knowledgeable about the Third World Roman Catholic Church  say that sexual abuse by clergy is generally not discussed, and thus is difficult to measure. This may be due in part to the more hierarchical structure of the Church in Third World countries, the "psychological health" of clergy in those regions, and because Third World media, legal systems and public culture are not as apt to thoroughly discuss sexual abuse. In the Philippines, where  at least 85% of the population is Catholic, the revelations of sexual abuse by priests, including child sexual abuse, followed the United States' widespread reporting in 2002.

Academic Mathew N. Schmalz notes India as an example: "you would have gossip and rumors, but it never reaches the level of formal charges or controversies." Traditionally, the Roman Catholic Church has held tight control over many aspects of church life around the globe, but it left sex abuse cases to be handled locally. In 2001, the church first required that sex abuse cases be reported to Rome. In July 2010, the Vatican doubled the length of time after the 18th birthday of the victim in which clergymen can be tried in a church court. It also streamlined the processes for removing abusive priests.

According to a 2004 research study by the John Jay College of Criminal Justice for the United States Conference of Catholic Bishops, 4,392 Catholic priests and deacons in active ministry between 1950 and 2002 have been plausibly (neither withdrawn nor disproven) accused of underage sexual abuse by 10,667 individuals. Estimating the number of priests and deacons active in the same period at 110,000, the report concluded that approximately 4% have faced these allegations. The report noted that "It is impossible to determine from our surveys what percent of all actual cases of abuse that occurred between 1950 and 2002 have been reported to the Church and are therefore in our dataset." The Augustin Cardinal Bea, S.J. specializes in abuse counseling and is considered an expert on clerical abuse; he states "approximately 4% of priests during the past half century (and mostly in the 1960s and 1970s) have had a sexual experience with a minor." According to Newsweek magazine, this figure is similar to the rate of frequency in the rest of the adult population.

In 2014, the Permanent Representative of the Holy See to the UN, Silvano Maria Tomasi, appeared before the Committee against Torture and reported that during the previous ten years, 3420 cases of abuse against minors had been investigated and 884 priests had been removed from their positions and reduced to lay status. Allegations of and convictions for sexual abuse by clergy have occurred in many countries. There are no accurate figures available on the number of sexual abuse cases in different regions. But, in 2002 The Boston Globe reported, "clearly the issue has been most prominent in the United States." The US is the country with the highest number of reported Catholic sex abuse cases.

After the United States, the country with the next highest number of reported cases is Ireland. A significant number of cases have also been reported in Australia, New Zealand, Canada, and countries in Europe, Latin America, Africa, and Asia.

In response to the attention, members of the church hierarchy  have argued that media coverage has been unfair, excessive, and disproportionate. According to a Pew Research Center study, in 2002 the media coverage was focused on the US, where a series in The Boston Globe initiated widespread coverage in the region. However, by 2010 the focus had shifted to Europe.

In September 2011, a submission was lodged with the International Criminal Court alleging that the Pope, Cardinal Angelo Sodano (Dean of the College of Cardinals), Cardinal Tarcisio Bertone (Cardinal Secretary of State), and Cardinal William Levada (then-current Prefect of the Congregation for the Doctrine of the Faith) had committed a crime against humanity by failing to prevent or punish perpetrators of rape and sexual violence in a "systematic and widespread" concealment which included failure to co-operate with relevant law enforcement agencies. In a statement to the Associated Press, the Vatican described this as a "ludicrous publicity stunt and a misuse of international judicial processes." Lawyers and law professors emphasized that the case is likely to fall outside the court's jurisdiction.

On 13 May 2017, Pope Francis acknowledged that the Vatican had a 2,000 case backlog of sex abuse cases.

Philip Jenkins, professor at the Department of Religion and History at Penn State University, questioned the theses of increased sexual abuse among priests, saying the percentage of priests accused of molesting minors is 1.8%, much of which is not about pedophilia alone.

Major cases 
In the late 1940s, the American priest Gerald Fitzgerald founded the Congregation of the Servants of the Paraclete, a religious order that treats Roman Catholic priests who struggle with personal difficulties such as substance abuse and sexual misconduct. In a series of letters and reports to high-ranking Catholic leaders starting in the 1950s, Fitzgerald warned of substantial problems with abusive priests. He wrote, for example, "[sexual abuse] offenders were unlikely to change and should not be returned to ministry." He discussed the problem with Pope Paul VI (1963–1978) and "in correspondence with several bishops".

In 2001, the Vatican first required that sex abuse cases be reported to the Vatican hierarchy; before that, it left management of the cases to local dioceses. After the 2002 revelation by The Boston Globe that cases of abuse were widespread in the Church in Massachusetts and elsewhere, The Dallas Morning News did a year-long investigation. It reported in 2004 that even after these revelations and public outcry, the institutional church had moved allegedly abusive priests out of the countries where they had been accused but assigned them again to "settings that bring them into contact with children, despite church claims to the contrary". Among the investigation's findings was that nearly half of 200 cases "involved clergy who tried to elude law enforcement."

The cases received significant media and public attention in the United States, Ireland where abuse was reported as widespread, and Canada, and throughout the world. In response to the attention, members of the church hierarchy have argued that media coverage has been excessive and disproportionate. According to a Pew Research Center study, media coverage was generated mostly in the United States, beginning in 2002, with a series in The Boston Globe that published hundreds of news reports. By contrast, in 2010 much of the reporting focused on child abuse in Europe.

Americas

Central America

Costa Rica

Different scandals of sexual abuse involving members of the Catholic clergy have been made public in Costa Rica, as more than ten priests have been formally accused. However, one of the most recent and most dramatic events due to its media exposure occurred in 2019 when judicial accusations against the priests Mauricio Víquez and Manuel Guevara led to the search and seizure of the Episcopal Conference by the Judicial Investigation Department on 7 March 2019. Víquez, who was the Episcopal Conference's spokesman and professor at the University of Costa Rica, was dismissed from the clerical state by the Holy See and the process for removal of his university tenure was started. He fled in January 2019 and was a fugitive overseas reason for which an international arrest warrant was issued against him. He was captured in Mexico in August 2019 and condemned in 2022 to 20 years in prison for rape and abuse of 11-year-old boy. In the case of Guevara, parish priest of Santo Domingo de Heredia, was arrested by the authorities.

Another priest wanted for sexual abuse, Jorge Arturo Morales Salazar, was arrested by the authorities while trying to escape through the Panama border and held on preventive custody. Other notable cases are Father Enrique Delgado, popular figure due to his TV show La Hora Santa (The Holy Hour) who was sentenced to prison for rape and sexual abuse against three minors, Father Enrique Vazquez who escaped the country in 1998 apparently with financial help from San Carlos' bishop Angel Sancasimiro, was captured serving as a priest in Honduras in 2007, but the charges couldn't be pressed due to the age difference of less than 28 years between the victims of 13–16 years and the perpetrator of 20 years, and Father Minor Calvo, another TV personality with his TV show An encounter with Christ and as director of the Catholic radio station Radio maria who was found in a car with a teenager in the La Sabana Park at midnight. Although Calvo was convicted for corruption and embezzlement he was not convicted for sexual abuse.

Dominican Republic
Józef Wesołowski, a Polish citizen who had been a nuncio (papal ambassador), was laicized in 2014 because of accusations of sexual abuse of minors during the five years he served as Vatican ambassador in Santo Domingo. The Holy See refused to waive his diplomatic immunity in order to allow him to be judged in Santo Domingo, but charged him before the Vatican criminal tribunal.  However, in July 2015 the trial was postponed due to Wesolowski's ill health; he died on 27 August 2015 before a trial could be held.

El Salvador

In November 2015, in El Salvador's sole non-military Catholic diocese, the Archdiocese of San Salvador, Fr. Jesus Delgado, biographer and personal secretary to Archbishop Oscar Romero was dismissed by the Archdiocese after investigations revealed that he had molested a girl, now 42 years of age, when she was between the ages of 9 and 17. Due to the statute of limitations, Delgado could not face criminal charges. In December 2016, a canonical court convicted Delgado and two other El Salvador priests, Francisco Galvez and Antonio Molina, of committing acts of sex abuse between the years 1980 and 2000 and laicized them from the priesthood.

In November 2019, the Archdiocese acknowledged sex abuse committed by Fr. Leopoldo Sosa Tolentino in 1994 and issued a public apology to his victim. Tolentino was suspended from ministry and began the canonical trial process. Another El Salvador priest José Adonay Chicas Campos was laicized in 2019 after pleading guilty to sex abuse in a criminal trial at the Vatican and sentenced to 16 years in prison.

Honduras

In 2018 Pope Francis accepted the resignation of auxiliary bishop Juan José Pineda, a close aide of Cardinal Maradiaga, following revelations of sexual abuse of the seminarians and financial scandal.

North America

Canada

In the late 1980s, allegations were made of physical and sexual abuse committed by members of the Christian Brothers, who operated the Mount Cashel Orphanage in St. John's, Newfoundland. The government, police, and church had colluded in an attempt to cover up the allegations, but in December 1989 they were reported in the St. John's Sunday Express. Eventually more than 300 former pupils came forward with allegations of physical and sexual abuse at the orphanage. The religious order that ran the orphanage filed for bankruptcy in the face of numerous civil lawsuits seeking damages. Since the Mount Cashel scandal, a number of priests across Canada have been accused of sexual abuse.

In August 2005, Father Charles Henry Sylvestre of Belle River, Ontario pleaded guilty to 47 counts of sexual abuse of females, aged between nine and fourteen years old, between 1952 and 1989. Sylvestre was given a sentence in October 2006 of three years, and died 22 January 2007 after three months in prison.

In 2011, Basilian priest Father William Hodgson Marshall, who died in 2014 at the age of 92, pled guilty to 16 counts of indecent assault of minors and one count of sexual assault for incidents that occurred between 1952 and 1986 when he taught at Assumption and Holy Names high schools in Windsor, plus other Catholic high schools in Toronto and Sudbury. He was sentenced to two years in prison, and served 16 months of his sentence before being released on probation in 2012. However, Marshall, who was given the nickname "Happy Hands" in the 1950s due to his tendency to touch students, later pled guilty to more sex abuse charges stemming from his time in Saskatchewan. On 30 April 2020, the Canadian Supreme Court rejected an appeal from the Basilian Fathers of Toronto to not give Marshall victim Rod MacLeod a required payment of just over $2.5 million, including $500,000 in punitive damages, stemming from a sexual-assault case in the 1960s. The payment was first ordered by a jury in April 2018.

On 25 August 2020, British Columbia justice David Crossin ordered the office of the Bishop of Kamloops and retired priest Erlindo Molon, who was by then 88 years old, to pay $844,140 in damages to Rosemary Anderson, who claimed Molon raped her 70 to 100 times in 1976 and 1977, beginning when she was 26 years old. Anderson claimed Molon offered her counselling to help her deal with her father's death. During the lawsuit, former Kamloops bishop, and future Vancouver Archbishop, Adam Exner now 90, conceded on the stand that Molon “was molesting people,” including Anderson. Exner also stated that Molon was not stripped of his priesthood status until after Anderson told him that Molon raped her and suggested that she marry him.

By 1912, thousands of First Nations children attended residential schools, many of which were run by the Catholic Church. In 1990, Manitoba leader Phil Fontaine revealed that he had been sexually and physically abused in a Catholic residential school. He claimed that sexual abuse was common in residential schools in general. "In my grade three class, if there were 20 boys, every single one of them would have experienced what I experienced. They would have experienced some aspect of sexual abuse."
Canadian author and artist, Michael D. O'Brien, has also spoken out about his painful experiences of residential school abuse, revealing that "the sexual exploitation of the young has been epidemic in Catholic residential schools and orphanages."

Mexico 
Of the Catholic sexual abuse cases in Latin America, the most widely known is the sexual scandal of Father Marcial Maciel, the founder of the Legion of Christ, a Roman Catholic congregation in 1970s. He had been sexually abusing at least 60 minors and fathered six children with three women. The revelations took place in 1998 after the Legion spent more than a decade denying allegations and criticizing the victims who claimed abuse. He was forced to retire from the ministry by Pope Benedict XVI in 2006.

Luis Esteban Zavala Rodríguez, a priest in Irapuato, was condemned to 65 years and three months in prison and fined MXN $61,000 in January 2021 for raping a 12-year-old girl as she took catechism classes at a church in the city.

United States 

The United States has been the focus of many scandals and subsequent reforms. BishopAccountability.org, an "online archive established by lay Catholics", have reported over 3,000 civil lawsuits against the church, some of these cases have resulted in multimillion-dollar settlements with many claimants, totaling more than $3 billion since 1950.

While the church in the United States claims to have addressed the issue, some disagree. Mark Honigsbaum of The Guardian wrote in 2006 that, "despite the National Review Board's own estimates that there have been some 5,000 abusive priests in the US, to date 150 have been successfully prosecuted."  Some critics of the church, such as Patrick Wall, attribute this to a lack of cooperation from the church. In California, for example, the archdiocese has sought to block the disclosure of confidential counseling records on two priests, arguing that such action would violate their First Amendment right on religious protection. Paul Lakeland claims Church leaders who enabled abuse were too frequently careless about their own accountability and the accountability of perpetrators.

In 2004, the Roman Catholic Diocese of Orange settled nearly 90 cases for $100 million. In July 2007, its parent archdiocese, the Roman Catholic Archdiocese of Los Angeles reached a settlement of 45 lawsuits for $60 million.  By July 2007, a $660 million agreement was made with more than 500 alleged victims.

In September 2007, the Roman Catholic Diocese of San Diego reached a $198.1 million "agreement with 144 childhood sexual abuse victims".

In July 2008, the Roman Catholic Archdiocese of Denver agreed "to pay $5.5 million to settle 18 claims of childhood sexual abuse."

In 1998, the Roman Catholic Diocese of Dallas paid $30.9 million to twelve victims of one priest ($ in present-day terms). From 2003 to 2009, nine other major settlements, involving over 375 cases with 1551 claimants/victims, resulted in payments of over US$1.1 billion. The Associated Press estimated the settlements of sex abuse cases from 1950 to 2007 totaled more than $2 billion. Addressing "a flood of abuse claims" five dioceses (Tucson, Arizona; Spokane, Washington; Portland, Oregon; Davenport, Iowa, and San Diego) got bankruptcy protection. Eight Catholic dioceses have declared bankruptcy due to sex abuse cases from 2004 to 2011.

Although bishops had been sending sexually abusive priests to facilities such as those operated by the Servants of the Paraclete since the 1950s, there was scant public discussion of the problem until the mid-1960s. Even then, most of the discussion was held amongst the Catholic hierarchy with little or no coverage in the media. A public discussion of sexual abuse of minors by priests took place at a meeting sponsored by the National Association for Pastoral Renewal held on the campus of the University of Notre Dame in 1967, to which all U.S. Catholic bishops were invited.

Various local and regional discussions of the problem were held by Catholic bishops in later years. However, it was not until the 1980s that discussion of sexual abuse by Roman Catholic clerics began to be covered as a phenomenon in the news media of the United States. According to the Catholic News Service, public awareness of the sexual abuse of children in the United States and Canada emerged in the late 1970s and the 1980s as an outgrowth of the growing awareness of physical abuse of children in society.

In September 1983, the National Catholic Reporter  published an article on the topic. The subject gained wider national notoriety in October 1985 when Louisiana priest Gilbert Gauthe pleaded guilty to 11 counts of molestation of boys. After the coverage of Gauthe's crimes subsided, the issue faded to the fringes of public attention until the mid-1990s, when the issue was again brought to national attention after a number of books on the topic were published.

In 2002, The Boston Globes Pulitzer Prize-winning coverage of sexual abuse cases involving Catholic priests drew the attention, first of the United States and ultimately the world, to the problem. Other victims began to come forward with their own allegations of abuse, resulting in more lawsuits and criminal cases. Since then, the problem of clerical abuse of minors has received significantly more attention from the Church hierarchy, law enforcement agencies, government and the news media. One study shows that the Boston Globe coverage of the cases "had a negative and long-lasting effect" on Catholic school enrollment, and explained "about two-thirds of the decline in Catholic schooling."

In 2003, Archbishop Timothy M. Dolan of the Roman Catholic Archdiocese of Milwaukee authorized payments of as much as US$20,000 to sexually abusive priests to convince them to leave the priesthood.

In July 2003, the Roman Catholic Archdiocese of Louisville paid $25.7 million to "settle child sexual-abuse allegations made in 240 lawsuits naming 34 priests and other church workers." In 2003, the Roman Catholic Archdiocese of Boston also settled a large case for $85 million with 552 alleged victims. In 2004, the Roman Catholic Diocese of Orange settled nearly 90 cases for $100 million.

The Roman Catholic Diocese of Dallas paid $30.9 million in 1998 to twelve victims of one priest ($ in present-day terms).

In April 2007, the Roman Catholic Archdiocese of Portland in Oregon agreed to a $75 million settlement with 177 claimants and the Roman Catholic Archdiocese of Seattle agreed to a $48 million settlement with more than 160 victims. In July 2007, the Roman Catholic Archdiocese of Los Angeles reached a $660 million agreement with more than 500 alleged victims, in December 2006, the archdiocese had a settlement of 45 lawsuits for $60 million.

As recently as 2011, Fr Curtis Wehmeyer was allowed to work as a priest in Minnesota despite many people having reported concern about his sexual compulsion and suspicious behavior with boys. Wehmeyer was employed as a priest without proper background checks. Wehmeyer was later convicted of sexually abusing two boys. After Wehmeyer's arrest there were complaints the responsible clergy were more concerned with how to spin the story in a favorable light than in helping victims.

In July 2018, Cardinal Theodore McCarrick of the Archdiocese of Washington, D.C. resigned from the College of Cardinals (the first Cardinal to do so since 1927) following allegations of abuse and attempted homosexual rape at a seaside villa. In August, a "systematic coverup" of sex abuse by more than 300 priests in Pennsylvania parishes was revealed. Reviewers of the situation indicated that many more victims and perpetrators were likely undiscovered. In March 2018, Archbishop Anthony Apuron of Guam was removed from office by the Vatican. Apuron had been accused of sexually molesting altar boys in the late 1970s. Moreover, in the latest case, priest Louis Brouillard was charged for having raped altar boys during "sleepovers" as a teenager. Over fifteen priests, two archbishops, and a bishop have been recognized in sex abuse cases, from the 1950s until the 1990s.

Addressing "a flood of abuse claims" five dioceses (Tucson, Arizona; Spokane, Washington; Portland, Oregon.; Davenport, Iowa, and San Diego) got bankruptcy protection. Eight Catholic diocese have declared bankruptcy due to sex abuse cases from 2004 to 2011.

In January 19, 2023, a man named Scott Verti filed a lawsuit Verti with about 100 instances of abuse at St. Elizabeth Ann Seton Church in Fort Collins, Colo., from 1998 to 2003. Due to the 2021 state law in Colorado, a three year window period was opened to allow sexual allegations to be brought forward dating back as far as 1960. The defendant Timothy Evans, a priest was accused of sexual abuse when Verti was 13 to 18 years old.

Jay Report 
In the United States, the 2004 John Jay Report, commissioned from the John Jay College of Criminal Justice and funded by the U.S. Conference of Catholic Bishops (USCCB), was based on volunteer surveys completed by the Roman Catholic dioceses in the United States. The 2004 John Jay Report was based on a study of 10,667 allegations against 4,392 priests accused of engaging in sexual abuse of a minor between 1950 and 2002.

Withholding names of accused clergy 
On 29 December 2019, it was revealed that numerous bishops across the United States withheld hundreds of names from their accused clergy list.

Allowing accused clergy to leave country 
On 6 March 2020, a joint investigation conducted by Propublica and the Houston Chronicle was published which revealed that the Catholic Church transferred more than 50 credibly accused U.S. Catholic clergy to other countries after sex abuse accusations surfaced against them.

Vatican report on Theodore McCarrick 
The Holy See Secretariat of State's report, published in November 2020, stated that Pope John Paul II was made aware of allegations against McCarrick but did not believe them, and that Benedict XVI, after receiving further complaints, also made little effort to stop McCarrick. The report absolved Pope Francis, but placed blame on both Pope John Paul II and Benedict XVI for Theodore McCarrick's rise in power they both were aware of sex abuse allegation against him.

South America

Argentina 
In 2009, priest Julio César Grassi was sentenced to 15 year in prison for two counts of sexual abuse against two minors during his time at a foundation for children in need.

On 17 August 2019, Argentina Bishop Sergio Buenanueva of San Francisco, Cordoba, acknowledged the history of sex abuse in the Catholic Church in Argentina. Buenanueva, who was labeled as a "Prelate" for the Argentine Catholic Church, also stated that the church's sex abuse crisis in Argentina, which is Pope Francis' native country, was "just beginning".

A three-judge court cleared former priest Carlos Eduardo José, 62, of sexual abuse charges from 1999 to 2008 in Caseros, Buenos Aires because the statute of limitations had expired by March 9, 2021. The accusations date from 2009 but the church took no action until 2019. Three other complaints against the same priest by other students were earlier dismissed by other courts on statute of limitations grounds.

Chile 

Early in 2018, Pope Francis met with Bishop Juan Barros from Chile concerning the charges of sexual abuse by Fr. Fernando Karadima, and accusations of cover-up by Barros. Many laypersons and victims of sexual abuse came forward to condemn Barros for covering up the sex crimes. When Pope Francis visited the bishop, he was asked by local reporters about the sexual abuse scandal surrounding Barros.  Pope Francis quickly condemned the charges a "slander", stating, "The day they bring me proof against Bishop Barros, I will speak. There is not one piece of evidence against him. It is calumny. Is that clear?"
Following the pope's defense of Barros, Boston Cardinal Sean Patrick O'Malley, a key Vatican advisor on clergy abuse, acknowledged that Francis' comments about Barros were "a source of great pain" for victims.  Francis then appointed Archbishop Charles Scicluna of Malta to investigate the allegations of abuse in the Chilean church. Upon receiving Scicluna's report, Francis wrote on 12 April that he had "made serious mistakes in the assessment and perception of the situation, especially because of a lack of truthful and balanced information". He also declared that the Chilean church hierarchy was collectively responsible for "grave defects" in handling sexual abuse cases and the resulting loss of credibility suffered by the church. Following Francis' remarks, 33 Chilean bishops offered their resignation. Pope Francis later apologized to the victims of the sex abuse scandal. In late April 2018, three victims were invited to the Vatican.

On 11 June 2018, Francis accepted the resignations of Bishop Juan Barros Madrid of Osorno, and on 28 June those of Bishops Horacio Valenzuela of Talca and Alejandro Goić Karmelić of Rancagua. In September, he accepted those of those of Carlos Eduardo Pellegrín Barrera of Chillán and Cristián Contreras Molina of San Felipe.
Karadima was laicized on 28 September 2018.

On 13 October 2018, Pope Francis laicized two former archbishops: Francisco José Cox Huneeus of La Serena and Marco Antonio Órdenes Fernández of Iquique.

In March 2019, Cardinal Ricardo Ezzati Andrello resigned as required upon turning 75 amid allegations of sexual abuse.

On 21 August 2019, Chile's nuncio announced that the Vatican had launched an investigation into claims that Bernardino Piñera, an influential Chilean priest who is also a paternal uncle of Chilean President Sebastian Piñera, sexually abused at least one child 50 years prior.

Colombia 

In 2021, an investigation by Vorágine and CONNECTAS revealed a list of 43 priests from the Archdiocese of Medellín accused of child molestation and sexual abuse, only three of whom had been sentenced by justice. In 2022, the AFP news agency reported one of the most serious cases revealed to date in the country, involving a network of pederasty that would include at least 38 abusive priests in the city of Villavicencio, of which 19 of them had been suspended two years before by the Vatican in the midst of the canonical investigation. The Constitutional Court in a historic decision had ordered in Judgment T-091 of 2020 the Colombian Catholic Church to reveal its "secret file" of complaints, to journalists or citizens who required it. From that date the hierarchs of the church have not fully complied with that instruction.

Asia

India 
In 2002, Mathew N. Schmalz noted that Catholic Church sexual abuse cases in India are generally not spoken about openly, stating "you would have gossip and rumors, but it never reaches the level of formal charges or controversies."

In 2014, Raju Kokkan, the vicar of the Saint Paul's Church in Thaikkattussery, Thrissur, Kerala, was arrested on charges of raping a nine-year-old girl. According to Kerala Police, Kokkan had raped the child on several different occasions, including at least thrice in his office during the month of April. Kokkan promised to gift the child expensive vestments for her Holy Communion ceremony before sexually assaulting her. The abuse was revealed after the victim informed her parents that she had been raped by Kokkan on 25 April 2014. The priest subsequently fled to Nagercoil in the neighbouring state of Tamil Nadu, and was arrested by police on 5 May. Following the arrest, the Thrissur Archdiocese stated that the vicar had been removed from his position within the Church. Between February and April 2014, three other Catholic priests were arrested in the state of Kerala on charges of raping minors.

In 2016, the Catholic Church reappointed a convicted and jailed priest in the Ootacamund Diocese in Tamil Nadu, with little regard for victims rights and children's safety.

In 2017, Father Robin Vadakkumchery of St Sebastian church in Kannur was arrested in Kochi on the charge of repeatedly raping a 15-year-old girl who later gave birth to a child. The baby is reported to have been taken to an orphanage without the mother's consent. He has been sentenced to 20 years in prison by a special court constituted under the Protection of Children from Sexual Offences Act, 2012 in Thalassery.

In 2018, after much public outcry, Bishop Franco Mulakkal was arrested on 21 September by the Kerala Police. The Vatican had just 'temporarily' relieved him from his pastoral responsibilities. The nun who complained against Bishop Franco had mentioned to the police that he had repeatedly had unnatural sex with her on multiple occasions between 2014 and 2016.

Singapore
In 2013, Singapore-born psychotherapist and author Jane Leigh, a single mother of two who now lives in Melbourne, alleged in her autobiography My Nine Lives Last that she was sexually abused by Roman Catholic priests when she was a teenager. Starting from when she was 12 years old, she was abused for two and half years during the secluded one-on-one outings by a 34-year-old priest whom she initially met at neighbourhood mass held at her home when she was 12, he allegedly did so while picking or dropping her off when her parents were at work. After she reported the matter to her mother, she was berated for tempting the priest and sent to another Catholic priest for counselling. Consequently, church stated that they will conduct the investigations.

In 2022, a prominent member of the Catholic order in his mid-60s was jailed 5 years for sexually abusing 2 teenage boys on multiple occasions. The offences took place between 2005 and 2007. The identity of the perpetrator and his victims were not revealed due to a gag order imposed by the court. Additionally, the perpetrator's religious superior was issued a written advisory by the police for not reporting the offences to the police after learning about them.

Europe

Austria 

In November 2010, an independent group in Austria that operates a hotline to help people exit the Catholic Church released a report documenting physical, sexual, and emotional abuse perpetrated by Austrian priests, nuns, and religious officials. The report is based on hotline calls from 91 women (28%) and 234 men (72%), who named 422 perpetrators of both sexes, 63% of whom were ordained priests.

Belgium

In June 2010, Belgian police raided the Belgian Catholic Church headquarters in Brussels, seizing a computer and records of a Church commission investigating allegations of child abuse. This was part of an investigation into hundreds of claims that had been raised about alleged child sexual abuse committed by Belgian clergy. The claims emerged after Roger Vangheluwe, who had been the Bishop of Bruges, resigned in 2009 after admitting that he was guilty of sexual molestation. The Vatican protested against the raids. In September 2010, an appeals court ruled that the raids were illegal.

Croatia 
There are three main known cases of sexual abuse in Croatian Catholic Churches: in Archdiocese of Zagreb, Archdiocese of Rijeka and Archdiocese of Zadar.

In Archdiocese of Zagreb guilty convicted priest was Ivan Čuček (2000), in Archdiocese of Rijeka Drago Ljubičić (2011), and in Archdiocese of Zadar Nediljko Ivanov (2012).

France

Cardinal Philippe Barbarin, the Archbishop of Lyon, was convicted on 7 March 2019 of failing to report sex abuse allegedly committed by priest  Bernard Preynat and was given a six-month suspended prison sentence. On 5 July 2019,  Pope Francis laicized the priest whom Barbarin was accused of protecting.  Despite Barbarin's conviction being overturned on appeal, the scandal resulted in Pope Francis accepting his resignation as Archbishop of Lyon on 6 March 2020.

On 14 January 2020, Preynat, who was previously convicted on another sex abuse charge in 2016, confessed during his criminal trial that he had a habit of "caressing" Boy Scouts he oversaw when he served as scout chaplain in the Lyon suburb of Sainte-Foy-lès-Lyon and that he did so in a way which brought him "sexual pleasure". On 15 January, Preynat, who is accused of molesting 80 Boy Scouts between 1971 and 1991, stated that the Vatican let him complete his seminary education for becoming a priest after he had undergone therapy at the Vinatier Psychiatric Hospital between 1967 and 1968, and that he had warned that Vatican about his sexual impulses. After Preynat's 2016 conviction for abuse committed between 1986 and 1991, which also resulted in only an 18-month suspended prison sentence, Barbarin reportedly appointed him to a higher position within the Archdiocese of Lyon.

On 9 November 2019, the Conference of French Bishops approved a resolution agreeing that every French Catholic Bishop would pay compensation for abuse which took place in the French Catholic Church. On 16 March 2020, Preynat received a five-year prison sentence after being convicted of sexually assaulting boy scouts. On 11 November 2020, Jean-Marc Sauve, the head of the independent commission set up by the Catholic Church in France to investigate claims of sex abuse, acknowledged his commission's sex abuse hotline, which closed on 31 October 2020, received 6,500 calls reporting sex 
abuse in a period of 17 months. On 16 December 2020, former Apostolic nuncio to France Luigi Ventura received a suspended eight-month prison sentence for sexually harassment, which includes probation and a required payment of €13,000 to the victims, as well as €9,000 in legal fees.

On 3 October 2021, an independent commission set up by the Bishops' Conference of France released a report estimating that the ranks of the 115,000 Catholic priests and other religious officials in France since the 1950s have included about 3,000 abusers. The report estimates that 216,000 children were abused by Catholic priests between 1950 and 2020, and that accounting for abuse by other Catholic church employees increases the total number to around 330,000.  Around 80% of the victims were boys.

Germany

In September 2018, a report by the German Catholic Church found that 3,677 children in Germany, mostly 13 or younger, had been sexually abused by Catholic clergy between 1946 and 2014. In August 2020, at 1,412 people in Germany accused members of Catholic religious orders of sexually abusing them as children, teenagers, and as wards. At least 654 monks, nuns and other members of religious orders were accused of abuse. Around 80% of the victims were male and 20% female. The orders were among the last Catholic church organizations in Germany to address sex abuse. Despite the facts that women make up the largest membership of German religious orders, male religious order members had the largest share of sex abuse accusations.

In May 2021, Cardinal Reinhard Marx offered his resignation, citing collective failure in dealing with sexual abuse as his main reason. Subsequently, Pope Francis denied his offer, while emphasizing the importance of Marx's repentance in his subsequent tenure.

Ireland

In the Republic of Ireland, starting in the 1990s, there were a series of criminal cases and government enquiries related to allegations that priests had abused hundreds of minors over previous decades. State-ordered investigations documented "tens of thousands of children from the 1940s to the 1990s" who suffered abuse, including sexual abuse at the hands of priests, nuns, and church staff in three dioceses.

In many cases, senior clergy had moved priests accused of abuse to other parishes. By 2010, a number of in-depth judicial reports had been published, but with relatively few prosecutions. The abuse was occasionally made known to staff at the Department of Education, the police, and other government bodies. They have said that prosecuting clergy was extremely difficult given the "Catholic ethos" of the Irish Republic. In addition, in 2004, the Christian Brothers had sued for a civil settlement that barred prosecution of any of its members or the naming of any Christian Brother in the government investigatory report. Christian Brothers had a higher number of allegations made against their order than were made against others. Neither were any victims named in the report.

In 1994, Micheal Ledwith resigned as President of St Patrick's College, Maynooth when allegations of sexual abuse by him were made public. The June 2005 McCullough Report found that a number of bishops had rejected concerns about Ledwith's inappropriate behavior towards seminarians "so completely and so abruptly without any adequate investigation", although his report conceded that "to investigate in any very full or substantial manner, a generic complaint regarding a person's apparent propensities would have been difficult".

Fr Brendan Smyth was reported to have sexually abused and indecently assaulted 20 children in parishes in Belfast, Dublin and the United States, during the period between 1945 and 1989. Controversy over the handling of his extradition to Northern Ireland led to the 1994 collapse of the Fianna Fáil/Labour coalition government.

In December 2010, Archdiocese of Dublin "singing priest" Tony Walsh was sentenced to 123 years in prison for 14 child abuse convictions involving sex-related offences dating from the mid-1970s to the mid-1980s. However, the sentences were to be served concurrently, netting to a maximum of 16 years. By the time he pleaded guilty in December 2018 to indecently assaulting a teenage boy with a crucifix on a date in 1983, Walsh had already been in prison for 13 years.

Six reports by the National Board for Safeguarding Children in the Catholic Church have up until 2011 established that six Irish priests were convicted between 1975 and 2011.

In August 2018, a list was published which revealed that over 1,300 Catholic clergy in Ireland had been accused of sexual abuse, and that by this time, 82 of them got convicted. In May 2020, it was revealed that prior to the 2004 merger with the Scout Association of Ireland (SAI) which formed Scouting Ireland, Catholic Boy Scouts of Ireland (CBSI) covered up sex abuse committed by people who served in the organization. In a period spanning decades, both the CBSI and SAI shielded 275 known or suspected predators who abused children after becoming aware of the reported acts of abuse. Scouting Ireland backed the findings of the report and issued an apology.

Italy

In October 2018, Italian victim rights group Rete l'Abuso released a statement saying that since 2000 the Italian justice system had handled about 300 cases of abusive priests and nuns, with 150 to 170 convictions.

Norway
After revelations by Norwegian newspaper Adresseavisen, the Catholic Church in Norway and the Vatican acknowledged in 2010 that Georg Müller had resigned in July 2009 from the position of Bishop of Trondheim which he held from 1997 because of the discovery of his abuse of an altar boy two decades earlier. The Vatican cited Canon law 401 §2, but as is customary gave no details. The Norwegian Catholic Church was made aware of the incident at the time but did not alert the authorities. Norwegian law did not allow a criminal prosecution of Müller so long after the event.

Poland

During 2013, the public in this deeply Catholic country became concerned about reports of child sex abuse scandals within the Church, some of which reached the courts, and the poor response by the church. The Church resisted demands to pay compensation to victims.
In October 2013, the Catholic Church in Poland explicitly refused to publish data on sexual abuse, but said that, "if the data were to be published, the scale would be seen to be very low". Bishop Antoni Dydycz said that priests should not be pressed to report sexual abuse to state authorities, invoking the ecclesiastical "seal of confession", which bans them from revealing what is said in the rite of confession.

On 27 September 2018, Bishop Romuald Kamiński of the Warsaw-Praga Diocese issued an apology to those who had been sexually abused by priests in his Diocese and that church leaders in Poland had completed work on a document to address the abuse of minors and suggest ways to prevent it. According to Archbishop Wojciech Polak, the head of Poland's Catholic Church, the document will also include data on the scale of priestly sex abuse in Poland. By early 2019, however, the document still had not been made public. On 8 October 2018, a victims group mapped out 255 cases of alleged sex abuse in Poland.

Statistics were released on 14 April 2019, commissioned by the Episcopal Conference of Poland and with data from over 10,000 local parishes. It was found that from 1990 to mid-2018, abuse reports about 382 priests were made to the Church, with 625 children, mostly under 16, sexually abused by members of the Catholic clergy. There were opinions that the figures underestimated the extent of the problem, and failed to answer questions church officials had avoided for years. Marek Lisinski, the co-founder of Don't Be Afraid, which represents victims of clerical abuse, said "Tell us how [the priests] hurt those children and how many times they were transferred to different parishes before you paid notice". The data were released a few weeks after Pope Francis had called for "an all-out battle against the abuse of minors". After pressure from the Pope, in the preceding years Poland's Church had publicly apologised for abuses, and accepted the need to report those accused of such crimes. In earlier times, clergy to whom sexual abuse of minors was reported were not required by their superiors to notify the police, but to investigate themselves, and if necessary inform the Vatican.

On 11 May 2019, Polak issued an apology on behalf of the entire Catholic Church in Poland. The same day, Tell No One, a documentary detailing accounts of sex abuse by Catholic Church clergy in Poland, went viral, reaching 8.1 million viewers on YouTube by 13 May. Among many, the film featured a priest known as Father Jan A., whose case is being reviewed by the Diocese of Kielce, who confessed to molesting many young girls. The film also alleges that Rev. Dariusz Olejniczak, a priest who was sentenced for molesting 7-year-old girls, was allowed to continue working with young people despite his conviction. On 14 May 2019, Poland's ruling Law and Justice (PiS) party, which has long had an alliance with the nation's Catholic Bishops, agreed to increase penalties for child sex abuse by raising the maximum prison sentence from 12 years to 30 years and raising the age of consent from 15 to 16. Prosecutor and PiS lawmaker Stanislaw Piotrowicz, who heads the Polish Parliament's Justice Commission, has also been criticized for playing down the actions of a priest who was convicted for inappropriately touching and kissing young girls.

On 25 June 2020, Pope Francis appointed Grzegorz Rys, Archbishop of Łódź, Apostolic Administrator of the Diocese of Kalisz, relieving its Bishop, Edward Janiak, age 67, of his responsibilities while under investigation for protecting priests who committed acts of sex abuse. On 17 October, Pope Francis accepted Janiak's resignation.

In February 2019, three protestors toppled a statue of Rev. Henryk Jankowski following revelations that he sexually abused Barbara Borowiecka when she was a girl. Jankowski, who also had a criminal investigation involving the sexual abuse of a boy dropped against him in 2004, had been defrocked in 2005. However, he died in 2010 without ever being convicted of sex abuse. It has also been acknowledged that Lech Walesa's personal chaplain Rev. Franciszek Cybula had been accused of committing acts of sex abuse while serving in the as well. On 13 August 2020, Pope Francis removed Gdansk Archbishop Slawoj Leszek Glodz, who was among those who covered up abuse committed by Jankowski and Cybula. Glodz had also presided over Cybula's funeral. Despite the fact that Glodz turned 75, the required age for Catholic Bishops to offer their resignation, the move was described as "cleaning house", as it is highly unusual for the pope to accept such a resignation on a prelate's actual birthday.

On 6 November 2020, The Holy See's nuncio to Poland announced that following an investigation by the Holy See regarding sex abuse allegations, Cardinal Henryk Gulbinowicz was now "barred from any kind of celebration or public meeting and from using his episcopal insignia, and is deprived of the right to a cathedral funeral and burial." Gulbinowicz was also ordered to pay an "appropriate sum" to his alleged victims.
Gulbinowicz is the former archbishop of Wrocław, whose support of the trade union Solidarity played a critical role in the collapse of communism in Poland. On 16 November 2020, 10 days after the Vatican, Gulbinowicz, but, as a result of the Vatican displinary action, could not have a funeral in Wroclaw's Cathedral of St. John the Baptist or to be buried in the cathedral.

Portugal 
A report published in February 2023 revealed that at least 4,815 children had been sexually abused by clergy in the Catholic church in Portugal since 1950.

United Kingdom

In 2013, Cardinal Keith O'Brien, the Archbishop of Saint Andrews and Edinburgh, resigned following publication of allegations he had engaged in inappropriate and predatory sexual conduct with priests and seminarians under his jurisdiction and abused his power.

In 2020, the Independent Inquiry into Child Sexual Abuse released a report which stated that the Catholic Church of England and Wales "swept under the carpet" allegations of past child sex abuse by numerous Catholic clergy in England and Wales. According to the report "there was no acknowledgement of any personal responsibility" by Vincent Nichols, since 2014, a cardinal and the senior Catholic cleric in England and Wales. The report said that Nichols cared more about the impact of abuse on the Church's reputation than on the victims, and lacked compassion towards them.

Northern Ireland
In Northern Ireland, the Northern Ireland Historical Institutional Abuse Inquiry started in January 2014. It was the largest inquiry in UK legal history into sexual and physical abuse in certain institutions (including non-Catholic ones) that were in charge of children from 1922 to 1995. The De La Salle Brothers and the Sisters of Nazareth admitted early in the inquiry to physical and sexual abuse of children in institutions in Northern Ireland that they controlled, and issued an apology to victims. A 2017 report also stated that the local police, who had also poorly investigated claims of sex abuse at the non-Catholic Kincora Boys' Home, had played a role in assisting the local Catholic officials in covering up reported sexual abuse activity at four Catholic-run homes for boys in the Belfast area and that these four homes had contained the highest level of reported sex abuse of all the 22 homes which were investigated.

Oceania

Australia 

The Catholic church in Australia had been criticised for mishandling childhood sexual abuse cases which are severe in nature and widespread in extent. Catholic priests were charged by 2011 in over 100 cases of childhood sexual abuse in Australia. The Catholic Church had secretly paid equivalent of $276.1 million by 2017 in compensation to thousands of childhood sexual abuse victims of priests and religious brothers. Inquiries established that historically Australian Catholic church officials often, where cardinal George Pell knew about sex abuse in Catholic church as early as 1973, ignored or punished the child victim, did not investigate allegations, documents were destroyed or not kept, failed to prevent future abuse by clergy who had come to their attention by transferring clergy and religious members to new parishes or dioceses which did not know of their past and not stripping them of their religious status. John Paul II and Benedict XVI made apologies for abuse in Australia.

Royal Commission into Institutional Responses to Child Sexual Abuse (2015–17) found that 7% of all Catholic priests in Australia were "alleged perpetrators of child sex abuse", average age of victims was 11.5 for boys and 10.5 for girls. Royal Commission found that 46% (92 out of 201) of Catholic Churches had child sexual abuse cases. Royal Commission had 4,756 child sexual abuse cases from 4,444 victims against 1,880 accused, in 62% cases the accused were Catholic priests and religious brothers and the rest were members of church. Abuse victim Amber Louise criticized Church's Towards Healing protocol, started in 1996 to "establish a compassionate and just system for dealing with complaints of abuse", who told the Royal Commission that the program delayed reporting her complaint. In June 2019, 18 months after being ordered to do so by the Royal Commission, the Australian Catholic Church published its National Catholic Safeguarding Standards closely mirroring Royal Commission's recommendations and government's National Principles for Child Safe Organizations.

In 2019, Fr Vincent Gerald Ryan, who had previously served 14 years in jail for sexually abusing 34 boys from 1973 to 1991, was jailed for at least 14 months for sex abuse he committed against two altar boys.

In September 2020, the Australian state of Queensland passed legislation which makes it so religious institutions, such as the Catholic church, and their members are no longer able to use the sanctity of confession as a defence against failing to report material information about the sexual abuse of children. Under the new Queensland law, clergy who refuse to report confessions of sex abuse will face a maximum sentence of three years in prison. In October 2020, the Royal Commission into Institutional Responses to Child Sexual Abuse found that the church had failed to intervene against Thomas Butler, a Marist Brother known as Brother Patrick, when students reported that he sexually abused them within the three-year period he taught at Queensland capital Brisbane's Marist College Ashgrove. Butler had received sex abuse complaints in between 1991 and 1993. Provincial of the Marist Brothers in Australia, Brother Peter Carroll, delivered an apology at the royal commission's public hearing.

Governmental and legal responses

Ireland 

In an address before the Irish parliament on 11 May 1999, Taoiseach Bertie Ahern announced a comprehensive program to respond to the scandal of abuse in the nation's Catholic-run childcare institutions. Ahern's speech included the first official apology to those who had been abused physically and sexually while they had been in the care of these institutions. The Taoiseach asked the abuse victims for forgiveness, saying: "On behalf of the State and of all citizens of the State, the Government wishes to make a sincere and long overdue apology to the victims of childhood abuse for our collective failure to intervene, to detect their pain, to come to their rescue."

In response to the furor aroused by the media reports of abuse in Irish government institutions run by religious orders, the Irish government commissioned a study which took nine years to complete. On 20 May 2009, the commission released its 2600-page report, which drew on testimony from thousands of former residents and officials from more than 250 institutions. The commission found that there were thousands of allegations of physical abuse of children of both sexes over a period of six decades. Over the same period, around 370 former child residents alleged they had suffered various forms of sexual abuse from religious figures and others. The report revealed that government inspectors had failed in their responsibility to detect and stop the abuse. The report characterized sexual molestation as "endemic" in some church-run industrial schools and orphanages for boys.

In the wake of the broadcast of a BBC Television documentary, Suing the Pope, which highlighted the case of Seán Fortune, one of the most notorious clerical sexual offenders, the Irish government initiated an official inquiry into the allegations of clerical sexual abuse in the Irish Roman Catholic Diocese of Ferns. The inquiry resulted in the publication of the Ferns Report in 2005.

In response to the Ferns Report, Ireland's Prime Minister Brian Cowen stated that he was "ashamed by the extent, length, and cruelty" of child abuse, apologized to victims for the government's failure to intervene in endemic sexual abuse and severe beatings in schools for much of the 20th century. Cowen also promised to reform the Ireland's social services for children in line with the recommendations of the Commission to Inquire into Child Abuse report. Irish President Mary McAleese and Cowen made further motions to start criminal investigation against members of Roman Catholic religious orders in Ireland.

In November 2009, Commission to Inquire into Child Abuse reported its findings in which it concluded that:

In 2009, The Murphy Report is the result of a three-year public inquiry conducted by the Irish government into the Sexual abuse scandal in Dublin archdiocese, released a few months after the report of the Ryan report. The Murphy report stated that, "The Commission has no doubt that clerical child sexual abuse was covered up by the Archdiocese of Dublin and other Church authorities". It found that, "The structures and rules of the Catholic Church facilitated that cover-up." Moreover, the report asserted that, "State authorities facilitated that cover-up by not fulfilling their responsibilities to ensure that the law was applied equally to all and allowing the Church institutions to be beyond the reach of the normal law enforcement processes."  The report criticized four archbishops – John Charles McQuaid who died in 1973, Dermot Ryan who died in 1984, Kevin McNamara who died in 1987, and retired Cardinal Desmond Connell – for not giving allegations and information on abusers to legal authorities.

United Nations 
The United Nations Committee on the Rights of the Child, in early 2014, issued a report asserting that the pope and the Roman Catholic Church have not done enough and protect their reputation rather than protect children. A joint statement of the panel said,Committee chair Kirsten Sandberg enumerated some major findings, including that abusive priests were sent to new parishes or other countries without police being informed, that the Vatican never insisted on bishops reporting abuse to police, and that known abusers still have access to children. Barbara Blaine of SNAP said,

The UN report prompted discussions of specific areas of controversy, including a veil of secrecy among bishops and Vatican statements denying canonical legal responsibility.

British author and Catholic social activist Paul Vallely contended that the UN report had been hurt by the Commission having gone well beyond the issue of child abuse by investigating other issues unrelated to sexual abuse, such as contraception. However, he also found that the report brought substantial pressure on the Vatican to redress major issues, such as the absence of appropriate institutional protocol for the reporting of sexual abuse cases to police.

United States
The Associated Press estimated the settlements of US Church sex abuse cases from 1950 to 2007 totaled more than US$2 billion. The figure was more than $3 billion in 2012 according to BishopAccountability.

Civil lawsuits 

In July 2003, the Roman Catholic Archdiocese of Louisville paid $25.7 million to "settle child sexual-abuse allegations made in 240 lawsuits naming 34 priests and other church workers."

According to The Boston Globe, the Archdiocese of Boston secretly settled child sexual abuse claims against at least 70 priests from 1992 to 2002. In 2003, the Archdiocese of Boston also settled a large case for $85 million with 552 alleged victims.

In April 2007, the Roman Catholic Archdiocese of Portland in Oregon agreed to a $75 million settlement with 177 claimants and the Roman Catholic Archdiocese of Seattle agreed to a $48 million settlement with more than 160 victims.

In July 2008, the Roman Catholic Archdiocese of Denver agreed "to pay $5.5 million to settle 18 claims of childhood sexual abuse."

Addressing "a flood of abuse claims" five dioceses (Tucson, Arizona; Spokane, Washington; Portland, Oregon; Davenport, Iowa, and San Diego) got bankruptcy protection. Eight Catholic diocese have declared bankruptcy due to sex abuse cases from 2004 to 2011.

The cost to the Church of providing for victim restitution settlements increased rapidly. Taking into account sums awarded to victims by juries, out-of-court settlements and legal fees, estimates went from $0.5 billion by the late 1990s to more than $2.6 billion in 2009. Roman Catholics spent $615 million on sex abuse cases in 2007.

The great number of compensatory settlements levied on the Church made it necessary for dioceses to reduce their ordinary operating expenses, some even closing churches and parochial schools in order to raise the funds to make these payments. Several dioceses chose to declare Chapter 11 bankruptcy as a way to litigate settlements while protecting enough church assets needed for the maintaining of operations. In some cases, the dioceses filed bankruptcy just before civil suits against them were about to go to trial. This had the effect of producing the mandate that forced pending and future lawsuits against the Church to be settled in bankruptcy court. In 2007, the sexual abuse scandal cost each of the 195 dioceses "an average of $300,000 annually."

Several dioceses adopted the preemptive practice of transferring the majority of their assets to their parishes and foundations before declaring bankruptcy, thereby decreasing the money available for settlement compensation. The Vatican's complicit involvement in this practice varied by case. In some cases, the Vatican had to approve the transfer of large amounts to foundations in order to shield them from seizure; in others it guided and supervised such transactions.

Resignations, retirements, and laicizations
Some of the accused priests were forced to resign. Some priests whose crimes fell within statutes of limitation are in jail. Some have been laicized. Others – because they are elderly, because of the nature of their offenses, or because they have had some success fighting the charges – cannot be laicized under canon law. Some priests live in retreat houses that are carefully monitored and sometimes locked.

Bernard Francis Law, Cardinal and Archbishop of Boston, Massachusetts, United States, resigned after Church documents were revealed which suggested he had covered up sexual abuse committed by priests in his archdiocese. On 13 December 2002, Pope John Paul II accepted Law's resignation as Archbishop and reassigned him to an administrative position in the Roman Curia, naming him archpriest of the Basilica di Santa Maria Maggiore, and he later presided at one of the Pope's funeral masses. Law's successor in Boston, Archbishop (later Cardinal) Seán P. O'Malley, found it necessary to sell substantial real estate properties and close a number of churches in order to pay the $120 million in claims against the archdiocese.

Two bishops of Palm Beach, Florida, resigned due to child abuse allegations. Resigned bishop Joseph Keith Symons was replaced by Anthony O'Connell, who later also resigned in 2002.

Convictions

Critique

Comparisons to other environments

Comparison to schools

Hofstra University researcher Charol Shakeshaft, the author of a report on sexual offenses in schools, said sexual violence is much more prevalent in schools than in the Church. According to the report, up to 422,000 students from California will be victims of sexual violence in the future.

Comparison to Protestant Churches and Jehovah's Witnesses 

A report which Christian Ministry Resources (CMR) released in 2002 stated that contrary to popular opinion, there are more allegations of child sexual abuse in Protestant congregations than there are in Catholic ones, and that sexual violence is most often committed by volunteers rather than by priests. It also criticized the way the media reported sexual crimes in Australia. The Royal Commission in Institutional Responses to Child Sexual Abuse revealed that between January 1950 and February 2015, 4,445 people alleged incidents of child sexual abuse in 4,765 claims. The media reportedly reported that as many as 7% of priests were accused of being a child sexual abuser, but ignored the same report on the Protestant Churches and Jehovah's Witnesses; Gerard Henderson stated:

One of the authors of an investigation by The Atlanta Journal-Constitution drew parallels between the handling of sexual assaults in the Church and how medical authorities handled similar abuse and assaults by doctors and psychologists. In both systems, the abusers are in positions of trust, admiration, and authority; the abuse is treated as an illness; the perpetrator is allowed to return to practice following an apology or rehabilitation program; and the incidents are hidden from the public for the good of the organization.

Debate over causes

There have been many debates over the causes of sex abuse cases.

Clerical celibacy

Opinion seems divided on whether there is any definite link or connection between the Roman Catholic institution of celibacy and incidents of child abuse by Catholic clergy.

A 2005 article in the conservative Irish weekly the Western People proposed that clerical celibacy contributed to the abuse problem by suggesting that the institution of celibacy has created a "morally superior" status that is easily misapplied by abusive priests: "The Irish Church's prospect of a recovery is zero for as long as bishops continue blindly to toe the Vatican line of Pope Benedict XVI that a male celibate priesthood is morally superior to other sections of society." Christoph Schönborn and Hans Küng have also said that priestly celibacy could be one of the causes of the sex abuse scandals within the Catholic Church.

Ernie Allen, president of the National Center for Missing and Exploited Children, said, "We don't see the Catholic Church as a hotbed of this or a place that has a bigger problem than anyone else. I can tell you without hesitation that we have seen cases in many religious settings, from traveling evangelists to mainstream ministers to rabbis and others." Philip Jenkins, a long-time Catholic turned Episcopalian, asserts that his "research of cases over the past 20 years indicates no evidence whatever that Catholic or other celibate clergy are any more likely to be involved in misconduct or abuse than clergy of any other denomination—or indeed, than non-clergy. However determined news media may be to see this affair as a crisis of celibacy, the charge is just unsupported."

Failure to disclose 

Church authorities are often accused of covering up cases of sex abuse. In many cases, as discussed in the sections on different countries, clergy discovered by Church authorities to be criminally offending are not reported to civil authorities such as the police. They are often merely moved from one diocese to another, usually without any warning to the authorities or the congregations at the destination. While offending clergy could be subject to action such as laicization, this is rare; the intention of the Church until recent times has been to avoid publicity and scandal at all costs.

In some cases offenders may confess their wrongdoing to a priest under the Sacrament of Penance. Church canon law unconditionally prohibits a priest hearing such a confession from making any disclosure about the existence or content of the confession to anybody, including Church and civil authorities—the "Seal of the Confessional". This obligation is taken very seriously throughout the Catholic Church; for example all serving archbishops in Australia told the Australian Royal Commission into Institutional Responses to Child Sexual Abuse that they would not report to police a colleague who admitted in the confessional to child rape. This is not always in contradiction with civil law; the law in many, but not all, countries confers confessional privilege, a rule of evidence that forbids judicial inquiry into certain communications between clergy and members of their congregation.

Gay priests and homosexuality

According to the John Jay Report, 80.9% of the abuse victims in the United States were male, and a study by Dr. Thomas Plante found the number may be as high as 90%. A number of books, such as The Rite of Sodomy: Homosexuality and the Roman Catholic Church, have argued that homosexual priests view sex with minors as a "rite of passage" for altar boys and other pre-adult males. William Donohue of the Catholic League said that the Church's child sexual abuse problem was really a "homosexual crisis", which some have dismissed as unwarranted by stating a lack of correlation between a man identifying as homosexual and any particular likelihood he will abuse children. Research on pedophilia in general shows a majority of abusers identify themselves as heterosexual, and the Causes and Context Study of the John Jay Institute found no statistical support for linking homosexual identity and sexual abuse of minors. Additionally The New York Times reported "the abuse decreased as more gay priests began serving the church."

Impact of psychology from previous decades
Some bishops and psychiatrists have asserted that the prevailing psychology of the times suggested that people could be cured of such behavior through counseling. Thomas Plante, a psychologist specializing in abuse counseling and considered an expert on clerical abuse, states "the vast majority of the research on sexual abuse of minors didn't emerge until the early 1980s. So, it appeared reasonable at the time to treat these men and then return them to their priestly duties. In hindsight, this was a tragic mistake."

Robert S. Bennett, the Roman Catholic Washington attorney who headed the National Review Board's research committee, identified "too much faith in psychiatrists" as one of the key problems concerning Catholic sex abuse cases. About 40% of the abusive priests had received counseling before being reassigned.

Moral relativism 
In 2019, Pope Emeritus Benedict XVI published a letter (in German and then translated into English) in which he provided a unified perspective on several issues that, together, he believes contributed to the sexual abuse scandal. One of the chief reasons put forth by the Pope was the push by several prominent theologians for relativistic perspectives on morality where "there could no longer be anything that constituted an absolute good, any more than anything fundamentally evil; (there could be) only relative value judgments."

Pedophilia and ephebophilia
In Sexual Addiction and Compulsivity: The Journal of Treatment and Prevention, Cimbolic & Cartor (2006) noted that because of the large share of post-pubescent male minors among cleric victims there is need to further study the differential variables related to ephebophilia (sexual interest in mid-to-late adolescents, generally ages 15 to 19) versus pedophilia (sexual interest in prepubescent children, generally those 13 years of age or younger) offenders. Cartor, Cimbolic & Tallon (2008) found that 6 percent of the cleric offenders in the John Jay Report are pedophiles, 32 percent ephebophiles, 15 percent attracted to 11- and 12-year-olds only (both male and female), 20 percent indiscriminate, and 27 percent mildly indiscriminate. Professor of psychology Thomas Plante (2004) criticized these findings, citing a report by Stephen Joseph Rossetti which found that only about 1% of Catholic priests have had a sexual experience with a child, while an additional 1% has had a sexual experience with an adolescent - totaling 2% of all Catholic clergy. This report also found that 80 percent to 90 percent of sexual abuse of children perpetrated by Catholic priests is directed towards adolescent boys; therefore, pedophilia among Catholic clergy appears to be rare with ephebophilia being more typical.

They also found distinct differences between the pedophile and ephebophile groups. They reported that there may be "another group of offenders who are more indiscriminate in victim choice and represent a more heterogeneous, but still a distinct offender category" and suggested further research to determine "specific variables that are unique to this group and can differentiate these offenders from pedophile and ephebophile offenders" so as to improve the identification and treatment of both offenders and victims.

All victims in the John Jay report were minors. Using a non-standard definition of "pre-pubescent", the Causes and Context Study of the John Jay College estimated that only a small percentage of offender priests were true pedophiles. The study classified victims as pre-pubescent if they were age 10 or younger, whereas the age bracket specified in the current guidelines issued by the American Psychiatric Association is "generally age 13 or younger". A recent book estimates that if the latter definition were used instead of the former, the percentage of victims classified as prepubescent would have been 54% rather than the 18% figure cited by the Causes and Context report, and that a higher percentage of priests would therefore have been classified as pedophiles.

Statement of Pope Francis
In July 2014, Pope Francis was quoted as having said in an interview that about 8,000 Catholic clergy (2% of the total), including bishops and cardinals, were pedophiles. The Vatican indicated the interview had not been recorded nor notes taken during it and that quotes may have been misattributed in a deliberate attempt to manipulate readers. They stated that Pope Francis had not indicated that any cardinal abusers remained in their position.

Shortage of priests
It has been argued that a shortage of priests caused the Roman Catholic hierarchy to act in such a way to preserve the number of clergy and ensure that sufficient numbers were available to man their congregations despite serious allegations that some of these priests were unfit for duty.

Purported declining standards in the prevailing culture
In The Courage To Be Catholic: Crisis, Reform, and the Future of the Church, author George Weigel claims that it was the infidelity to orthodox Roman Catholic teaching, the "culture of dissent" of priests, women religious, bishops, theologians, catechists, Church bureaucrats, and activists who "believed that what the Church proposed as true was actually false" was mainly responsible for the sexual abuse of parishioners' children by their priests. Cardinal Theodore Edgar McCarrick, a retired Archbishop of Washington who was himself later laicized due to sexual misconduct, blamed the declining morals of the late 20th century as a cause of the high number of child molestations by priests.

The hypothesis that a purported decline in general moral standards was associated with an increase in abuse by clergy was promoted by a study by John Jay College funded by the United States Conference of Catholic Bishops. The study claimed that the liberal 1960s caused the increase in abuse, and the conservative Reagan years led to its decline. The study was branded the 'Woodstock Defence' by critics who said that the study's own figures showed a surge in abuse reported from the 1950s, and the passage of time meant that reports of abuse from earlier decades were unlikely.

Seminary training
The 2004 John Jay Report, a report commissioned by the US Conference of Catholic Bishops, stated "the problem was largely the result of poor seminary training and insufficient emotional support for men ordained in the 1940s and 1950s." A report by the National Review Board issued simultaneously with the John Jay Report pointed to two major deficiencies on the part of seminaries: failure to screen candidates adequately, followed by failure to "form" these candidates appropriately for the challenges of celibacy. These themes are taken up by a recent memoir by Vincent J. Miles that combines a first-hand account of his life in a minor seminary during the 1960s with a review of the scientific literature about sexually abusive behavior. Miles identifies specific aspects of seminary life that could have predisposed future priests to engage in such behavior.

Male dominated culture of the church
Italian academic  wrote in L'Osservatore Romano that a greater presence of women in the Vatican could have prevented clerical sexual abuse from taking place.

This view has been challenged and severely criticized by several scholars for denying the cases of nuns implicated in sexual abuse and pedophilia. In 1986, a history scholar from Stanford University recovered archival information about investigations from 1619 to 1623 involving nuns in Vellano, Italy, secretly exploiting illiterate nuns for several years. In 1998, a religious research national survey on revealed a very high number of nuns reporting childhood victimizations of sexual abuse by other nuns. It was further noted that the majority of nun-abuse victims are of the same sex. In 2002, Markham examined the sexual histories of nuns to find several cases of nuns sexually abusing children.

Church responses

The responses of the Catholic Church to the sex abuse cases can be viewed on three levels: the diocesan level, the episcopal conference level, and the Vatican. Responses to the scandal proceeded at levels in parallel, with the higher levels becoming progressively more involved as the gravity of the problem became more apparent. For the most part, responding to allegations of sexual abuse in a diocese was left to the jurisdiction of the local bishop or archbishop. According to Thomas Plante, a psychologist specializing in abuse counseling and considered an expert on clerical abuse, "unlike most large organizations that maintain a variety of middle management positions, the organizational structure of the Catholic Church is a fairly flat structure. Therefore, prior to the Church clergy abuse crisis in 2002, each bishop decided for himself how to manage these cases and the allegations of child sexual abuse by priests. Some have handled these matters very poorly (as evidenced in Boston) while others have handled these issues very well."

After the number of allegations exploded following The Boston Globe series of articles, the breadth and depth of the scandals became apparent in dioceses across the United States. The U.S. bishops felt compelled to formulate a coordinated response at the episcopal conference level. Although the Vatican did not respond immediately to the series of articles published by The Boston Globe in 2002, it has been reported that Vatican officials were, in fact, monitoring the situation in the U.S. closely.

John L. Allen Jr., senior correspondent for the National Catholic Reporter, characterized the reaction of the United States Conference of Catholic Bishops (USCCB) as calling for "swift, sure and final punishment for priests who are guilty of this kind of misconduct." In contrast to this, Allen characterized the Vatican's primary concern as wanting to make sure "that everyone's rights are respected, including the rights of accused clergy" and wanting to affirm that it is not acceptable to "remedy the injustice of sexual abuse with the injustice of railroading priests who may or may not be guilty."

Communis Vita
On 26 March 2019, Pope Francis made public an apostolic letter titled Communis Vita (Community Life). The letter, which was issued on 19 March 2019, amends Canon Law and requires superiors to a local religious to dismiss any member of their  "religious house" if they have been absent for 12 months and out of contact. Canon Law already required superiors to track them down and encourage them to return to their local order after they have been absent for six months. The policy officially came into effect on 10 April 2019. Parish transfers of abusive priests have existed in numerous Catholic sex abuse cases.

Diocesan responses

Ireland

In 2009, eighteen religious orders agreed to pay €1.2 billion compensation to childhood victims of sexual abuse, a 10 times increase from the €128 million compensation agreed in 2002, on the condition that the identities of abusers must be kept secret, and victims will forgo the right to sue church and government. Money was raised mainly by selling church property to government.

Catholic Church Commission on Child Sexual Abuse (Ireland), also known as the Hussey Commission, was established by church in 2001 to investigate how complaints about clerical abuse of minors have been handled over the last three decades. In 2010 Vatican announced an investigation into Irish Catholic Establishment's handling of the sex abuse and subsequent scandal.

Philippines
After the media in Philippines began reporting on sexual abuses by local catholic priests, the year 2002 Catholic Bishops Conference of the Philippines apologized for sexual misconduct committed by its priests over the last two decades and committed to drafting guidelines on how to deal with allegations of such offenses. President of this conference, Archbishop Orlando Quevedo, stated that over the previous two decades nearly 200 of country's 7,000 catholic priests may have committed "sexual misconduct including child abuse, homosexuality and affairs".

In August 2011, after women's activist group "Gabriela" assisted a 17-year-old girl in filing sexual abuse allegations against a Catholic priest in Butuan province then bishop of Butuan, Juan de Dios Pueblos, took the accused priest under his custody without handing him over to civil and church authorities. This behaviour was also heavily criticized by retired Archbishop Oscar V. Cruz, who blamed Pueblos for showing his priests the "wrong way".

United States
According to the John Jay Report, one in four child sex abuse allegations were made within 10 years of the incident. Half were made between 10 and 30 years after the incident and the remaining 25% were reported more than 30 years after the incident. The Report points at: failure by the RCC hierarchy in the United States to grasp the seriousness of the problem, overemphasis on the need to avoid a scandal, use of unqualified treatment centers for clergy removed for rehabilitation, a sort of misguided willingness by bishops to forgive sexual misconduct as a moral failing and not treat it a crime, allowance of recidivism upon reassignment of the priest, and insufficient accountability of the hierarchy for inaction.

Rehabilitation efforts
Since 2002, a major focus of the lawsuits and media attention has been criticism of the approach taken by bishops when dealing with allegations of sexual abuse by priests. As a general rule, the allegations were not reported to legal authority for investigation and prosecution. Instead, many dioceses directed the offending priests to seek psychiatric treatment and for assessment of the risk of re-offending. In 2004, according to the John Jay report, nearly 40% of accused priests participated in psychiatric treatment programs. The remaining priests did not undergo abuse counseling because allegations of sexual abuse were only made after their death. The more allegations made against a priest, the more likely he was to participate in treatment.

Some bishops repeatedly moved offending priests from parish to parish after abuse counseling, where they still had personal contact with children. According to the USCCB, Catholic bishops in the 1950s and 1960s viewed sexual abuse by priests as "a spiritual problem, one requiring a spiritual solution, i.e. prayer".

However, starting in the 1960s, the bishops came to adopt an emerging view based on the advice of medical personnel who recommended psychiatric and psychological treatment for those who sexually abused minors. This view asserted that with treatment, priests who had molested children could safely be placed back into ministry, although perhaps with certain restrictions such as not being in contact with children. This approach viewed pedophilia as an addiction, such as alcoholism which can be treated and restrained.

Some of the North American treatment facilities most frequently used for this purpose included the Saint Luke Institute in Maryland; centers operated by the Servants of the Paraclete in Jemez Springs, New Mexico, and St. Louis, Missouri; John Vianney Center in Downingtown, Pennsylvania.; the Institute of Living in Hartford, Connecticut; and the Southdown Institute near Toronto, Ontario, in Canada. This approach continued into the mid-1980s, a period which the USCCB characterizes as the "tipping point in the understanding of the problem within the church and in society". According to researcher Paul Isley, however, research on priest offenders is virtually nonexistent and the claims of unprecedented treatment success with clergy offenders have not been supported by published data.

Prevention efforts

The USCCB perceived a lack of adequate procedures for the prevention of sexual abuse of minors, the reporting of allegations of such abuse and the handling of those reports. In response to deficiencies in canonical and secular law, both ecclesiastical and civil authorities have implemented procedures and laws to prevent sexual abuse of minors by clergy and to report and punish it if and when it occurs. In June 2002, the USCCB adopted a zero tolerance policy to future sex abuse that required responding to allegations of sexual abuse. It promulgated a Charter for the Protection of Children and Young People that pledged the Catholic Church in the U.S. to providing a "safe environment" for all children in Church-sponsored activities.

The Charter instituted reforms to prevent future abuse by requiring background checks for Church employees. The Charter requires dioceses faced with an allegation to alert the authorities, conduct an investigation and remove the accused from duty. A Dallas Morning News article reported nearly two-thirds of the bishops attending the conference had covered for sexually abusive priests. According to Catholic News Service by 2008, the U.S. church had trained "5.8 million children to recognize and report abuse," run criminal checks on volunteers and employees and trained them to create a safe environment for children.

Reception by the laity

A 2006 study by Jesuit Georgetown University Center for Applied Research in the Apostolate (CARA) found lay Catholics were unaware of the specific steps that the church has decided to take, but 78% strongly approved reporting allegations of sexual abuse to civil authorities and 76% strongly approved of removing people credibly accused of sexual abuse of a minor.

Ongoing investigations

In 2005, Kathleen McChesney of the USCCB said "In 2004, at least 1,092 allegations of sexual abuse were made against at least 756 Catholic priests and deacons in the United States....  What is over is the denial that this problem exists, and what is over is the reluctance of the Church to deal openly with the public about the nature and extent of the problem."

In early 2009, the sexual impropriety including molesting boys by Marcial Maciel Degollado, the founder of the Legion of Christ, a Roman Catholic congregation of pontifical right made up of priests and seminarians studying for the priesthood, was disclosed publicly. In March, the Vatican ordered an apostolic visitation of the sexual abuse scandal in the Legion of Christ. In June 2009 Vatican authorities named five bishops from five different countries, each one in charge of investigating the Legionaries in a particular part of the world.

Episcopal responses

United Kingdom
The 2001 Lord Nolan recommendations, accepted in full by the bishops, became model guidelines for other bishops' conferences around the world, and a model for other institutions in Britain. One guideline was that in each parish there should be a "safeguarding officer", a lay person who would vet through the Criminal Records Bureau, a government agency, anyone in the parish who had access to young people or vulnerable adults, and would be a contact for anyone with any concerns.

United States
In June 2002, the USCCB established the "Charter for the Protection of Children and Young People", a comprehensive set of procedures for addressing allegations of sexual abuse of minors by Catholic clergy. The charter includes guidelines for reconciliation, healing, accountability, reporting, and prevention of future acts of abuse.

The USCCB's National Review Board for the Protection of Children and Young People now requires dioceses faced with an allegation of child sexual abuse (where the victim is currently a minor) to alert the authorities, conduct an investigation, and (in the case of an admission of guilt or finding of guilt by an appropriate investigation) remove the accused from duty.

The Board also approached John Jay College of Criminal Justice to conduct a descriptive study of the nature and scope of the problem of child sexual abuse in the Catholic Church as well as the costs to the church of the scandal. Data collection commenced in March 2003, and ended in February 2004. The findings of this study are discussed elsewhere on this page.

Holy See's Response
John L. Allen Jr., Vatican correspondent for the National Catholic Reporter, commented that many American Catholics saw the Vatican's initial silence on The Boston Globe stories as showing a lack of concern or awareness about the issue. However, Allen said that he did not know anyone in the Roman Curia who was not at least horrified "by the revelations that came out of the Globe and elsewhere" or who would defend "Cardinal Law's handling of the cases in Boston" or "the rather shocking lack of oversight that revealed itself" though "they might have different analyses of what should have happened to him". Allen described the Vatican's perspective as being somewhat skeptical of the media handling of the scandal. In addition, he asserted that the Vatican viewed American cultural attitudes toward sexuality as being somewhat hysterical as well as exhibiting a lack of understanding of the Catholic Church.

According to Allen, cultural differences between the Vatican and American Catholics complicated the process of formulating a comprehensive response to the sexual abuse scandal: "there is a lot about the American culture and the American Church that puzzles people in the Vatican, and there is much about the Vatican that puzzles Americans and English speakers generally."

Motu Proprio Vos estis lux mundi

On 9 May 2019, Pope Francis issued the Motu Proprio Vos estis lux mundi requiring both clerics and religious brothers and sisters, including Bishops, throughout the world to report sex abuse cases and sex abuse cover-ups by their superiors. Under the new Motu Proprio, all Catholic dioceses throughout the world are required to establish stable mechanisms or systems through which people may submit reports of abuse or its cover-up by June 2020. All metropolitan Archdioceses are also required to send reports to the Holy See on the progress of the investigation, whether in their Archdiocese or suffragan dioceses, every 30 days and to complete the investigation within 90 days unless granted an extension. The law is effective for a three-year experimental period with a vacatio legis of 1 June 2019.  According to Canon law professor Kurt Martens:

Rescript "On the confidentiality of legal proceedings" 
On 17 December 2019, Pope Francis issued a canon law instruction "On the confidentiality of legal proceedings" lifting the "pontifical secret" in the cases relating to: violence or abuse of authority in forcing sexual acts, sexual abuse of minors or vulnerable persons, crimes of paedophilia involving children under 18 years of age or with incapacitated subjects and the concealment of those conducts from ecclesiastical or civil inquiries. Under the new provisions, are excluded from the pontifical secret all the stages of the canonical trials, from the denunciation, to the phase of the preliminary investigations, to the phase of the proper debate, and up to the final decision, as well as any witness statements and documents produced in trial. It concerns both the procedures that take place at the local level, and those that take place in Rome, at the Congregation for the Doctrine of the Faith.

The instruction provides however that the information obtain in a canonical trial be treated in such a way as to ensure its security, integrity and confidentiality with a view to protecting the good name, image and privacy of all persons involved. According to Archbishop Juan Ignacio Arrieta, Secretary of the Pontifical Council for Legislative Texts: "the fact that knowledge of these criminal actions is no longer bound by the "pontifical secret" does not mean that it provides the freedom to make it public by those in possession of it, which in addition to being immoral, would undermine the right to a good reputation". Moreover, the Instruction does not in any way counter the absolute duty of the Priest to observe the sacramental seal nor the duty of observe the confidentiality of information acquired outside of confession within the whole forum called "extra-sacramental".

The professional secrecy of those involved in a canonical trial should not constitute an obstacle to "the fulfilment of the obligations laid down in all places by the laws of the State, including any reporting obligations [of possible news of a crime], and the execution of the enforcement requests of the civil courts" which, naturally, could oblige the delivery of documentary material to the civil courts. In this regard, Prof. Giuseppe Dalla Torre, former president of the Vatican City State Tribunal, observed that:

According to Archbishop Charles Scicluna, adjunct secretary of the Congregation for the Doctrine of the Faith, the abolition of pontifical secrecy means that:

Prof. Dalla Torre underlined that this instruction is a canonical instrument which does not affect the application of the civil laws, as it regards the conduction of the trials and the cooperation with ecclesiastica authorities:

Response by year

1962

Cardinal Alfredo Ottaviani, Secretary of the Sacred Congregation of the Holy Office, sent a letter which became known as the Crimen sollicitationis. In this letter, addressed to "all Patriarchs, Archbishops, Bishops and other Local Ordinaries, including those of Eastern Rite", the Holy Office laid down procedures to be followed in dealing with cases of clerics (priests or bishops) of the Catholic Church accused of having used the sacrament of Penance to make sexual advances to penitents; its rules were more specific than the generic ones in the Code of Canon Law.

In addition, it instructed that the same procedures be used when dealing with denunciations of homosexual, pedophile or zoophile behaviour by clerics. It repeated the rule that any Catholic who failed for over a month to denounce a priest who had made such advances in connection with confession was automatically excommunicated and could be absolved only after actually denouncing the priest to the Ordinary of the place or to the Holy Congregation of the Holy Office, or at least promising seriously to do so.

1983
The Vatican promulgated a revised Code of Canon Law which included a canon (1395, §2) which explicitly named sex with a minor by clerics as a canonical crime "to be punished with just penalties, not excluding dismissal from the clerical state if the case so warrants." According to De delictis gravioribus, the letter sent in May 2001 by then Cardinal Joseph Ratzinger (who later became Pope Benedict XVI) – Prefect of the Congregation for the Doctrine of the Faith, and according to Father Thomas Patrick Doyle, who has served as an expert witness on Pontifical Canon Law, Crimen Sollicitationis was in force until May 2001.

2001
In April, Pope John Paul II issued a letter stating that "a sin against the Sixth Commandment of the Decalogue by a cleric with a minor under 18 years of age is to be considered a grave sin, or 'delictum gravius.'" In the letter, Sacramentorum sanctitatis tutela (Safeguarding the Sanctity of the Sacraments), "§1 Reservation to the Congregation for the Doctrine of the Faith (CDF) is also extended to a delict against the sixth commandment of the Decalogue committed by a cleric with a minor below the age of eighteen years. §2 One who has perpetrated the delict mentioned in §1 is to be punished according to the gravity of the offense, not excluding dismissal or deposition." In other words, the CDF was given a broader mandate to address the sex abuse cases only from 2001 – prior to that date, the 1917 Code of Canon Law permitted sexual abuse cases by the clergy to be handled by the Congregation, for the Congregation to open cases itself, or for the Ordinary to handle judgement. All priestly sex crimes cases were placed under the CDF which, in the majority of cases, then recommended immediate action.

The "Guide to Understanding Basic CDF Procedures concerning Sexual Abuse Allegations" explain briefly the procedures which have been derived from the 1983 Code of Canon Law and put in place since 30 April (the same day). Among the points made:
 Every allegation of sexual abuse of a minor by a priest is investigated by the local diocese and, if there is even a "semblance of truth" the case is referred to the Vatican CDF. "The local bishop always retains power to protect children by restricting the activities of any priest in his diocese."
 Civil law concerning reporting of crimes to the appropriate authorities should always be followed.
 The CDF may authorise the local bishop to try the case. If a priest (who has the right of appeal to the CDF) is found guilty, a number of canonical penalties are possible, including dismissal from the clerical state. "The question of damages can also be treated directly during these procedures."
 Some cases can be referred directly to the Pope, who can issue a decree of dismissal from the priesthood ex officio.
 Other disciplinary measures short of dismissal are available where the priest has undertaken to live a life of prayer and penance, but he can be dismissed if he breaks the conditions imposed.
 The CDF continues to update the 2001 law (Motu Proprio Sacramentorum Sanctitatis tutela) in the light of special faculties granted to the CDF by Popes John Paul II and Benedict XVI.

In May, in line with the 1983 Code of Canon Law and the 1990 Code of Canons of the Eastern Churches, a letter from the CDF was sent to the Catholic bishops.

2002
The Vatican instituted reforms to prevent future United States abuse by requiring background checks for all church employees who have contact with children. Since then, in the US, over 2 million volunteers and employees; 52,000 clerics; 6,205 candidates for ordination have had their backgrounds evaluated.

In June, the USCCB established the "Charter for the Protection of Children and Young People", a comprehensive set of procedures for addressing allegations of sexual abuse of minors by Catholic clergy. (More details in the Episcopal Responses section above.).

2003
Pope John Paul II stated that "there is no place in the priesthood and religious life for those who would harm the young".

In April, the Pontifical Academy for Life organized a three-day conference, entitled "Abuse of Children and Young People by Catholic Priests and Religious", where eight non-Catholic psychiatric experts were invited to speak to near all Vatican dicasteries' representatives. The panel of experts overwhelmingly opposed implementation of policies of "zero-tolerance" such as was proposed by the US Conference of Catholic Bishops. One expert called such policies a "case of overkill" since they do not permit flexibility to allow for differences among individual cases.

2004

In June, Louisville, Kentucky lawyer William McMurry filed suit against the Vatican on behalf of three men alleging abuse as far back as 1928, accusing church leaders of organizing a cover-up of cases of sexual abuse of children.

2005
In August, Pope Benedict was personally accused in a lawsuit of conspiring to cover up the molestation of three boys in Texas by Juan Carlos Patino-Arango in Archdiocese of Galveston-Houston. He sought and obtained immunity from prosecution as head of state of the Holy See. The Department of State "recognize[d] and allow[ed] the immunity of Pope Benedict XVI from this suit." See International position of the Pope for information on head-of-state immunity of a pope.

In November, the Vatican published Criteria for the Discernment of Vocation for Persons with Homosexual Tendencies, issuing new rules which forbid ordination of men with "deep-seated homosexual tendencies". While the preparation for this document had started ten years before its publication, this instruction is seen as an official answer by the Catholic Church to what was seen as a "pedophile priest" crisis. The US National Review Board cited the preponderance of adolescent males among the victims of clerical sexual abuse of minors in its report. The document was criticized by the National Association of Catholic Diocesan Lesbian and Gay Ministries for what some see as its implying that homosexuality is tied to the sexual abuse of children.

2007
Archbishop Csaba Ternyak, secretary of the Congregation for Clergy, put the following question to the experts: "[T]o what degree one can talk about the rehabilitation of the offender, what are the most effective methods of treatment, and on what grounds we can say that a person who has never offended is at risk to sexually molest someone?"

Ternyak spoke about the way that the crisis had damaged the priest-bishop relationship. He noted that there was a "sense of gloom" felt by the overwhelming majority of priests who had not been accused of any abuse but nonetheless who perceived that their bishops had turned against them and therefore had "become disillusioned about the effectiveness of the laws of the Church to defend their dignity and their inalienable rights". Ternyak also noted that "there have been more than a few suicides among accused priests."

2008
In April, during a visit to the United States, Pope Benedict admitted that he was "deeply ashamed" of the clergy sex abuse scandal that has devastated the American church. Benedict pledged that pedophiles would not be priests in the Roman Catholic Church. Pope Benedict also apologized for child abuse scandal in Australia.

In November, the United States Court of Appeals in Cincinnati denied the Vatican's claim of sovereign immunity, and allowed a lawsuit against the Catholic Church government by three men who claim they were sexually abused as children by priests in the Louisville, Kentucky, US archdiocese to proceed. The Vatican did not appeal the ruling.

2009
Two researchers reported that abuse cases had "steeply declined" after 1985 and that responses to abuse had changed substantially over 50 years, with suspension becoming more common than reinstatement.

In a statement, read by Archbishop Silvano Maria Tomasi at a meeting of the United Nations Human Rights Council in Geneva on 22 September 2009, the Holy See stated that the majority of Catholic clergy who had committed acts of sexual abuse against under-18-year-olds should not be viewed as pedophiles, but as homosexuals who are attracted to sex with adolescent males. The statement said that rather than pedophilia, "it would be more correct to speak of ephebophilia; being a homosexual attraction to adolescent males ... Of all priests involved in the abuses, 80 to 90% belong to this sexual orientation minority which is sexually engaged with adolescent boys between the ages of 11 and 17."

However, Margaret Smith and Karen Terry, two researchers who worked on the John Jay Report, cautioned against equating the high incidence of abuse by priests against boys with homosexuality, calling it an oversimplification and "an unwarranted conclusion" to assert that the majority of priests who abused male victims are gay. Though "the majority of the abusive acts were homosexual in nature ... participation in homosexual acts is not the same as sexual identity as a gay man."  She further stated that "the idea of sexual identity [should] be separated from the problem of sexual abuse... [A]t this point, we do not find a connection between homosexual identity and the increased likelihood of subsequent abuse from the data that we have right now." Tomasi's move angered many gay rights organisations, who claimed it was an attempt by the Vatican to redefine the Church's past problems with pedophilia as problems with homosexuality.

Empirical research shows that sexual orientation does not affect the likelihood that people will abuse children. Many child molesters cannot be characterized as having an adult sexual orientation at all; they are fixated on children.

2010
In April 2010, in response to extensive negative publicity and criticism of the Pope, the Vatican entered what the Associated Press called "full damage control mode". Cardinal Tarcisio Bertone, the Vatican's secretary of state, during a visit to Chile, linked the scandal to homosexuality. In response to widespread criticism of that statement, Vatican spokesman Federico Lombardi said Bertone's statement went outside the remit of church authorities, while maintaining that "the statement was aimed at 'clarifying' Cardinal Bertone's remarks and should not be seen as the Holy See 'distancing' itself from them." He also noted that 10 per cent of the cases concerned paedophilia in the "strict sense", and the other 90 per cent concerned sex between priests and adolescents. Giovanni Maria Vian, editor of L'Osservatore Romano, the Vatican's official newspaper, said the continuing criticism of Pope Benedict XVI and the Vatican in handling the clerical sex abuse crisis is part of a media campaign to sell newspapers. The Pope issued a statement that the "Church must do penance for abuse cases".

Msgr. Charles J. Scicluna explained in an interview with the Italian newspaper Avvenire:  "Between 1975 and 1985 I do not believe that any cases of pedophilia committed by priests were brought to the attention of our Congregation. Moreover, following the promulgation of the 1983 Code of Canon Law, there was a period of uncertainty as to which of the "delicta graviora" were reserved to the competency of this dicastery. Only with the 2001 "Motu Proprio" did the crime of pedophilia again become our exclusive remit... In the years (2001–2010) the Congregation for the Doctrine of the Faith (CDF) had "considered accusations concerning around three thousand cases of diocesan and religious priests, which refer to crimes committed over the last fifty years."

Pope Benedict issued an apology to those who had suffered from child abuse in Ireland in March 2010. The letter stated that the Pope was "truly sorry" for what they had suffered, and that "nothing can undo the wrong you have endured. Your trust has been betrayed and your dignity violated." Nevertheless, the letter was not enough to satisfy many critics, who felt that the letter failed to address their concerns, and mistakenly presented the abuse as an issue within the Church in Ireland, rather than acknowledging that it was a systemic problem.

In July 2010, the Vatican issued a document to clarify their position. They doubled the length of time after the 18th birthday of the victim that clergymen can be tried in a church court and to streamline the processes for removing abusive priests. However, the new rules that applied globally were criticized as being less strict than those that were already in place in the United States.

2011
In May, the Vatican published new guidelines, drawn up by Cardinal William Levada, the head of the Congregation of the Doctrine of the Faith, on dealing with the clergy sexual abuse cases. The guidelines tell the bishops and heads of Catholic religious orders worldwide to develop "clear and coordinated" procedures for dealing with the sexual abuse allegation by May 2012. The guidelines instruct the bishops to cooperate with the police and respect the relevant local laws in investigating and reporting allegations of sexual abuse by the clergy to the civic authorities, but do not make such reporting mandatory. The guidelines also reinforce bishops' exclusive authority in dealing with abuse cases. Victims advocacy groups criticized the new guidelines as insufficient, arguing that the recommendations do not have the status of church law and do not provide any specific enforcement mechanisms.

2014
The Pontifical Commission for the Protection of Minors was instituted by Pope Francis on 22 March 2014 for the safeguarding of minors. It is headed by Boston's cardinal archbishop, Sean P. O'Malley, O.F.M. Cap.

In November 2014, Pope Francis laicized and excommunicated abusive priest Father Jose Mercau of Argentina.

2018
At the beginning of 2018, Francis denied overwhelming reports of widespread sexual abuse by priests in Chile. In the face of the resulting outcry, he introduced an investigation that led to every bishop in Chile submitting his resignation; only a few of these were accepted, however.

At mid-year, amidst a series of abuse scandals in many countries, including the revelation that over a 50-year period, more than 300 priests were plausibly accused of abuse in the state of Pennsylvania alone, Pope Francis spoke of his "shame", without however offering concrete steps to remove abusive priests or sanction those who took part in cover-ups.

2019

From 21 to 24 February 2019, a four-day Catholic Church summit meeting was held in Vatican City, called the Meeting on the Protection of Minors in the Church with the participation of the presidents of all the episcopal conferences of the world to discuss preventing sexual abuse by Catholic Church clergy.

On 26 March 2019, one month after the summit was held, Pope Francis adopted:
 Vatican Law No. CCXCVII On the protection of minors and vulnerable persons;
 the Motu Proprio On the protection of minors and vulnerable persons;
 the Guidelines of the Vicariate of Vatican City on the protection of minors and vulnerable persons.

According to Andrea Tornielli, these:

Law No. CCXCVII requiries Vatican City officials, including those in the Roman Curia, and diplomatic personnel of the Holy See, such as the Apostolic Nuncios, to report sex abuse. Failure to do so can result in a fine of up to 5,000 euros (about $5,600) or, in the case of a Vatican gendarme, up to six months in prison. In addition, all crimes related to child abuse, including mistreatment, are persecutable "ex officio", even when the purported victim does not file an official report. The law also extends the statute of limitations to 20-year prescription that, in the case of and offence against a minor, begin to count from on his or her eighteenth birthday. In addition, the Governorate of the Vatican City State is required to set up, within the Vatican Department of Health and Welfare, service to support and assist the victims of abuse, providing them with medical and psychological assistance and informing them of their rights and of how to enforce them.

The motu proprio extends the application of the Vatican law to the Roman Curia and its personnel. It requires that, when recruiting staff, the candidate's suitability to interact with minors must be ascertained.

The Guidelines for the Vicariate of Vatican City are addressed to the canons, parish priests and coadjutors of the two parishes located within the Vatican, as well as to the priests, deacons and educators of the Saint Pius X Pre-Seminary, to all the religious men and women who reside in the Vatican, and to all those who work within the ecclesiastical community of the Vicariate of Vatican City. The guidelines require that, in the course of pastoral activities, those persons must always be visible to others when they are in the presence of minors, and that it is strictly forbidden to establish a preferential relationship with a single minor, to address a minor in an offensive way or to engage in inappropriate or sexually allusive conduct, to ask a minor to keep a secret, to photograph or to film a minor without the written consent of his parents. The Vicar of Vatican City has also the obligation to report to the Promoter of Justice any news of abuse that is not manifestly unfounded, and to remove the alleged perpetrator of the abuse from pastoral activities as a precautionary measure.

Criticisms of the church

In 2010, the BBC reported that the major causes of the scandal were the cover-ups and other alleged shortcomings in the way in which the church hierarchy has dealt with the abuses. Particularly, the actions of Catholic bishops in responding to allegations of clerical abuse were harshly criticized.

In September 2010, Pope Benedict XVI lamented that the Roman Catholic Church had not been vigilant enough or quick enough in responding to the problem of sexual abuse by Catholic clergy. Pope Benedict laicized 400 priests for abuses in two years of his papacy. A representative of Survivors Network of those Abused by Priests (SNAP), a group representing abuse victims, criticized the pope's remarks as "disingenuous" because, in her opinion, the church had in fact been "prompt and vigilant" in concealing the scandal. After Benedict's resignation in 2013, he was criticized by SNAP for allegedly protecting the church's reputation "over the safety of children". Representatives from the Center for Constitutional Rights (at the time engaged in an International Criminal Court case against Pope Benedict in which they were acting for SNAP), alleged that Pope Benedict had been directly involved in covering up some of the crimes.

Failure to prevent current and future acts of abuse

Mary Dispenza further states that crimes against children took place in the past, they take place now and they will continue to take place in the future unless Pope Francis and the bishops act decisively to ensure that child safety has higher priority than protecting priests and the image of the Catholic Church.

Holy See's denial of canonical competence

A Vatican spokesman stated, "When individual institutions of national churches are implicated, that does not regard the competence of the Holy See...The competence of the Holy See is at the level of the Holy See."

Citing canons 331 and 333 of the 1983 Code of Canon Law, James Carroll of The Boston Globe asserted that "On the question of how far papal authority extends, the canon law of the Catholic Church could not be clearer" and alleged that the Holy See's denial of competency contravenes canon law. Canon 331 states that "The vicar of Christ... possesses full, immediate, and universal ordinary power in the Church, which he is always able to exercise freely", and canon 333 states that "...By virtue of his office, the Roman pontiff not only possesses power over the universal church, but also obtains the primacy of ordinary power over all particular churches and groups of them."

Silvano Tomasi, the Holy See's permanent observer to the U.N. stated that the Vatican was not responsible for abusive priests because "priests are citizens of their own states, and they fall under the jurisdiction of their own country" but the United Nations report differed claiming that since priests are "bound by obedience to the pope" under canon law, then the Holy See is accountable. The report also urged the Vatican to insist that priests and bishops involve the police in all abuse reports and end a "code of silence" leading to whistleblowers being "ostracized, demoted and fired".

Lack of transparency in the doctrinal congregation 
To place the cases under the competence of the Vatican's Congregation for the Doctrine of the Faith has been criticized by some as making the process more secretive and lengthening the time required to address the allegations. For example, in his biography of John Paul II, David Yallop asserts that the backlog of referrals to the Congregation for the Doctrine of the Faith for action against sexually abusive priests is so large that it takes 18 months to merely get a reply.

Vatican officials have expressed concern that the church's insistence on confidentiality in its treatment of priestly sexual abuse cases was seen as a ban on reporting serious accusations to the civil authorities. Early in 2010 Cardinal Claudio Hummes, the head of the Congregation for Clergy, finally said that instances of sexual abuse by priests were "criminal facts" as well as serious sins and required co-operation with the civil justice system. Italian academic  described the conspiracy involved in hiding the offense as omerta, the Mafia code of silence, and said that "We can hypothesise that a greater female presence, not at a subordinate level, would have been able to rip the veil of masculine secrecy that in the past often covered the denunciation of these misdeeds with silence".

Some parties have interpreted the Crimen sollicitationis – a 1962 document ("Instruction") of the Holy Office (which is now called the Congregation for the Doctrine of the Faith) codifying procedures to be followed in cases of priests or bishops of the Catholic Church accused of having used the sacrament of Penance to make sexual advances to penitents – as a directive from the Vatican to keep all allegations of sexual abuse secret, leading to widespread media coverage of its contents. Daniel Shea, the US lawyer who found the document, said that the document "proves there was an international conspiracy to hush up sex abuse issues". The Vatican responded that the document was not only widely misinterpreted, but moreover had been superseded by more recent guidelines in the 1960s and 1970s, and especially the 1983 Code of Canon Law.

Non-removal of accused from church

The Catholic hierarchy has been criticized for not acting more quickly and decisively to remove, laicize and report priests accused of sexual misconduct. Cardinal Roger Mahony of the Archdiocese of Los Angeles, said: "We have said repeatedly that ... our understanding of this problem and the way it's dealt with today evolved, and that in those years ago, decades ago, people didn't realize how serious this was, and so, rather than pulling people out of ministry directly and fully, they were moved."

One early opponent of the treatment of sexually abusive priests was Father Gerald Fitzgerald, the founder of The Congregation of the Servants of the Paraclete. Although Fitzgerald started the Servants of the Paraclete to assist priests who were struggling with alcohol and substance abuse problems, he soon began receiving priests who had sexually abused minors. Initially, Fitzgerald attempted to treat such priests using the same spiritual methods that he used with his other "guests". However, as he grew convinced of the futility of treating sexually abusive priests, Fitzgerald came to oppose vehemently the return of sexual abusers to duties as parish priests. He wrote regularly to bishops in the United States and to Vatican officials, including the pope, of his opinion that many sexual abusers in the priesthood could not be cured and should be laicized immediately.

Eventually, Fitzgerald lost control of the Servants of the Paraclete. The center began to employ medical and psychological professionals who added psychiatry and medical treatment to the spiritual regimen of treatment favored by Fitzgerald. Fitzgerald continued to oppose these modifications to his treatment regimen until his death in 1969.

Bishop Manuel D. Moreno of Tucson, Arizona, United States repeatedly attempted to have two local abusive priests laicized and disciplined, pleading unsuccessfully in a letter of April 1997 with Cardinal Joseph Ratzinger as head of the Congregation for the Doctrine of the Faith to have one laicized; he was first suspended in 1990 and convicted by the church in 1997 of five crimes, including sexual solicitation in the confessional. The two were finally laicized in 2004. Bishop Moreno had been strongly criticized for failing to take action until details of his efforts became public.

In a New York Times article, Bishop Blase J. Cupich, chairman of the United States Bishops Committee for the Protection of Children and Young People, is quoted explaining why Father Fitzgerald's advice "went largely unheeded for 50 years": First, "cases of sexually abusive priests were considered to be rare." Second, Father Fitzgerald's, "views, by and large, were considered bizarre with regard to not treating people medically, but only spiritually, and also segregating a whole population with sexual problems on a deserted island." And finally, "There was mounting evidence in the world of psychology that indicated that when medical treatment is given, these people can, in fact, go back to ministry." This was a view which Cupich characterized as one that "the bishops came to regret".

In 2010, several secular and liberal Catholics were calling for Pope Benedict XVI's resignation, citing the actions of then Cardinal Ratzinger's blocking of efforts to remove a priest convicted of child abuse. The pope did eventually resign in 2013, although he said that he did so because of his declining health.

In 2012, William Lynn of the Archdiocese of Philadelphia was found guilty of one count of endangering the welfare of a child and sentenced to three to six years in prison. Lynn became the first United States church official to be convicted of child endangerment because of his part in covering up child sex abuse allegations by clergy.

Secrecy among bishops
As reported by the Boston Globe, some bishops had facilitated compensation payments to victims on condition that the allegations remained secret. For example,

In November 2009, the Irish Commission to Inquire into Child Abuse reported its findings in which it concluded that:
the Dublin Archdiocese's pre-occupations in dealing with cases of child sexual abuse, at least until the mid 1990s, were the maintenance of secrecy, the avoidance of scandal, the protection of the reputation of the Church, and the preservation of its assets. All other considerations, including the welfare of children and justice for victims, were subordinated to these priorities. The Archdiocese did not implement its own canon law rules and did its best to avoid any application of the law of the State.

In April 2010, Christopher Hitchens and Richard Dawkins wanted to prosecute the Pope for crimes against humanity due to what they see as his role in intentionally covering up abuse by priests. In a CNN interview a few days later, however, Dawkins declined to discuss the international crime law court's definition of crimes against humanity, saying it is a difficult legal question.
In April 2010, a lawsuit was filed in the Milwaukee Federal Court by an anonymous "John Doe 16" against the Vatican and Pope Benedict XVI. The plaintiff accused Ratzinger and others of having covered up abuse cases to avoid scandal to the detriment of the concerned children.
In February 2011, two German lawyers initiated charges against Pope Benedict XVI at the International Criminal Court. As one of the reasons for the charges they referred also to the "strong suspicion" that Joseph Ratzinger, as head of the Congregation for the Doctrine of the Faith, covered up the sexual abuse of children and youths and protected the perpetrators.

Internal division became public, with Christoph Cardinal Schönborn accusing Cardinal Angelo Sodano of blocking Ratzinger's investigation of a high-profile case in the mid-1990s.

In the trial of the French bishop Pierre Pican, who received a suspended jail sentence for failing to denounce an abusive priest, the retired Cardinal Dario Castrillon Hoyos wrote a letter to support Pican in his decision. Exposed to heavy critiques, Hoyos claimed to have had the approval of Pope John Paul II.

In 2011, Hoyos was heavily criticized again. This time, the Congregation for the Clergy was blamed of having opposed in 1997 to the newly adapted rules of the Irish bishops, demanding the denouncement of every abusive priest to the police. The Archbishop of Dublin Diarmuid Martin described the cooperation with the Congregation for the Clergy as "disastrous".

An article in The Washington Post published 27 December 2019, accuses former American Cardinal Theodore Edgar McCarrick of paying bribes totaling US$600,000 to Pope John Paul II ($50,000) and Pope Benedict XVI ($291,000) and 100 Vatican employees to cover-up sexual misconduct accusations against him.

Coverage

Media coverage

The media coverage of Catholic sex abuse cases is a major aspect of the academic literature. In 2002, the discovery that the sex abuse by Catholic priests was widespread in the U.S. received significant media coverage. For the first 100 days, The New York Times had 225 pieces, including news and commentary, and the story appeared on its front page on 26 occasions. Walter V. Robinson, an American journalist and journalism professor, led The Boston Globe coverage of the Roman Catholic sex abuse cases, for which the newspaper won the Pulitzer Prize for Public Service. Robinson was also a Pulitzer Prize finalist in Investigative Reporting in 2007.

In Ireland, television journalism similarly played a key role in helping public awareness of widespread sexual abuse of children by priests. British Broadcasting Corporation (BBC) produced the documentary Sex Crimes and the Vatican by a victim which included the claim that all allegations of sex abuse are to be sent to the Vatican rather than the civil authorities, and that "a secret church decree called 'Crimen sollicitationis' ... imposes the strictest oath of secrecy on the child victim, the priest dealing with the allegation, and any witnesses. Breaking that oath means instant banishment from the Catholic Church – excommunication." Documentary also quoted the 2005 Ferns Report.

Accusations of biased and excessive coverage 

Some critics have stated that the oversaturation of Church sex abuse stories has led to the perception that the Catholic Church is more rife with pedophilia than in reality.  A Wall Street Journal-NBC News poll found that 64 percent of those queried thought Catholic priests "frequently" abused children; however, there is no data that indicates that priests commit abuse more often than the general population of males. Anglican writer Philip Jenkins supported many of these arguments stating that media coverage of the abuse story had become "a gross efflorescence of anti-catholic rhetoric".

Commentator Tom Hoopes wrote that during the first half of 2002, the 61 largest newspapers in California ran nearly 2,000 stories about sexual abuse in Catholic institutions, mostly concerning past allegations. During the same period, those newspapers ran four stories about the federal government's discovery of the much larger – and ongoing – abuse scandal in public schools. Santa Clara University professor Thomas Plante states that the extensive media attention sexual abuse in the Catholic Church has spread many myths and misconceptions, such as the belief that Catholic priests are more likely to be pedophiles than laic men in general. His research found out that the percentage of Catholic priests who sexually abuse minors is not greater than the percentages of male clergy from other religious traditions who sexually victimize minors. At the same time, he comments that the Catholic Church has historically acted in a highly defensive and arrogant manner regarding this topic, which could have provoked excessive media coverage.

Popular culture

Many popular culture representations have been made of the sex abuse of children cases.

Publications
A number of memoirs and non-fiction books have been written about these issues, including Andrew Madden's Altar Boy: A Story of Life After Abuse, Carolyn Lehman's Strong at the Heart: How it Feels to Heal from Sexual Abuse, Larry Kelly's The Pigeon House which deals with abuse in the Pigeon House TB Sanatorium at Ringsend;, and Kathy O'Beirne's bestseller Kathy's Story, which details physical and sexual abuse suffered in a Magdalene laundry in Ireland. Writing in The Daily Telegraph, Ed West has asserted that Kathy Beirne's story is "largely invented", based on Hermann Kelly's Kathy's Real Story, a book by the journalist on the Irish Daily Mail; Kelly is also former editor of The Irish Catholic.

Films and documentaries
The Magdalene laundries were the subject of a drama film called The Magdalene Sisters (2002), which generated controversy as it was early in the revelations about abuses at Catholic homes. In 2006, a documentary called Deliver Us From Evil directed by Amy Berg and produced by Berg and Frank Donner was made about sexual abuse; it primarily focused on one priest and his crimes. It showed how far some clergy went in order to cover up the many reports of sexual abuse.  In Ireland, the documentary series, Suffer the Children (UTV, 1994), was released.

Many other feature films have been made about the continuing revelations of sex abuse within the Church, including:
 Judgment (1990)
 The Boys of St. Vincent (1992)
 Primal Fear (1996)
 Suing the Pope (2002), BBC documentary by Colm O'Gorman
 Song for a Raggy Boy (2003)
 Bad Education (2004), film by Pedro Almodóvar.
 Twist of Faith (2004), an HBO film
 Holy Water-Gate (2004), documentary
 Our Fathers (2005), a Showtime movie based on the book by David France
 Hand of God (2006), documentary filmed for Frontline
 Sex Crimes and the Vatican (2006), documentary filmed for the BBC Panorama Documentary Series that purports to show how the Vatican has used Crimen sollicitationis to silence allegations of sexual abuse by priests.
 Doubt (2008), based on the eponymous play
 What the Pope Knew, 2010 Panorama (BBC) episode
 Mea Maxima Culpa: Silence in the House of God, 2012 HBO film
 Calvary, 2014 Irish drama
 Perfect Obedience, 2014 Mexican film
 Ray Donovan Showtime TV Series (2013)
 The Prey - Silence in the Name of God (2013), Italian documentary by Luca Bellino and Silvia Luzi. 
 Spotlight (2015), drama based on The Boston Globes investigation and publishing about clergy abuse. Spotlight won the Academy Award for Best Picture, along with the Best Original Screenplay.
 The Keepers (2017), American documentary web series that was released on Netflix
 By the Grace of God (2019), French-Belgian drama
 Tell No One (2019), Polish documentary film by Tomasz Sekielski
 Revelation (2020), Australian documentary series by Nial Fulton and Sarah Ferguson
 Procession (2021), American documentary directed by Robert Greene

A daily updated list of films and documentaries is available at the "Literature List Clergy Sexual Abuse" composed by journalist and author .

Music
In 2005, Limp Bizkit released the album The Unquestionable Truth (Part 1), which focuses on dark lyrical subject matter, including Catholic sex abuse cases, terrorism and fame. Comedian Tim Minchin has the songs "The Pope Song", and "Come Home (Cardinal Pell)".

See also

 Sexual abuse cases in the Catholic Church 
 Settlements and bankruptcies in Catholic sex abuse cases
 Catholic Church sexual abuse cases by country
 Catholic Church sexual abuse cases in Australia
 Catholic Church sexual abuse cases in Belgium
 Catholic Church sexual abuse cases in Canada
 Catholic Church sexual abuse cases in Dublin
 Catholic Church sexual abuse cases in Europe
 Catholic Church sexual abuse cases in the English Benedictine Congregation
 Catholic Church sexual abuse cases in Ireland
 Catholic Church sexual abuse cases in New Zealand
 Catholic Church sex abuse cases in the United States

 Sexual abuse cases in other Christian denominations
 Jehovah's Witnesses' handling of child sex abuse
 Mormon abuse cases
 Sexual abuse scandal in Southern Baptist churches

 Critique & consequences related topics
 Criticism of Pope John Paul II
 Debate on the causes of clerical child abuse
 Ecclesiastical response to Catholic sexual abuse cases
 Instruction Concerning the Criteria for the Discernment of Vocations with Regard to Persons with Homosexual Tendencies in View of Their Admission to the Seminary and to Holy Orders
 Media coverage of Catholic sex abuse cases
 Sex Crimes and the Vatican, a BBC documentary
 Survivors Network of those Abused by Priests, an NGO for victims in the USA

 Investigation, prevention and victim support related topics
 Broken Rites Australia, a support and advocacy group in Australia
 National Review Board, USA
 National Society for the Prevention of Cruelty to Children, UK
 Pontifical Commission for the Protection of Minors
 Sexual Addiction & Compulsivity, a peer-reviewed journal on prevention & treatment
 Virtus (program), a church initiative in the USA
 Vos estis lux mundi, a church procedure for combating sexual abuse

 Other related topics
 Christianity and homosexuality
 Clerical celibacy
 Homosexual clergy in the Catholic Church
 Homosexuality and religion
 Pontifical secret
 Religious abuse
 Spiritual abuse

Notes

References

Further reading
 Erlandson, Gregory & Bunson, Matthew, Pope Benedict XVI and the Sexual Abuse Crisis (OSV, 2010)
 Groeschel, F. Benedict, From Scandal to Hope (OSV, 2002)
 Berry, Jason and Gerald Renner. Vows of Silence: The Abuse of Power in the Papacy of John Paul II (Free Press: 2004) 
 Jenkins, Philip, Pedophiles and Priests: Anatomy of a Contemporary Crisis (Oxford University Press, 2001). .
 Ranan, David, Double Cross: The Code of the Catholic Church (Theo Press Ltd., 2007) .
 Ivereigh & Griffin: Catholic Voices, (Darton Longman and Todd, 2010) 
 Ulrich L. Lehner Monastic Prisons and Torture Chambers. (Wipf and Stock, 2013)  A history of abuse and practices of cover up in the 16th, 17th and 18th c.

External links
 Holy See (Vatican): Abuse of minors. The church's response.
The Roman Catholic Church Investigation Report The Independent Inquiry into Child Sexual Abuse (IICSA). November 2020.
 Timeline, international but focussed on Germany, with sourced entries starting in 2001, frequently updated

 
20th-century scandals
21st-century scandals
Violence against children
Violence against men
Violence against women
Sexual abuse cover-ups